= Ogun State =

State of Nigeria

Ogun Ògùn (Yoruba)
- State
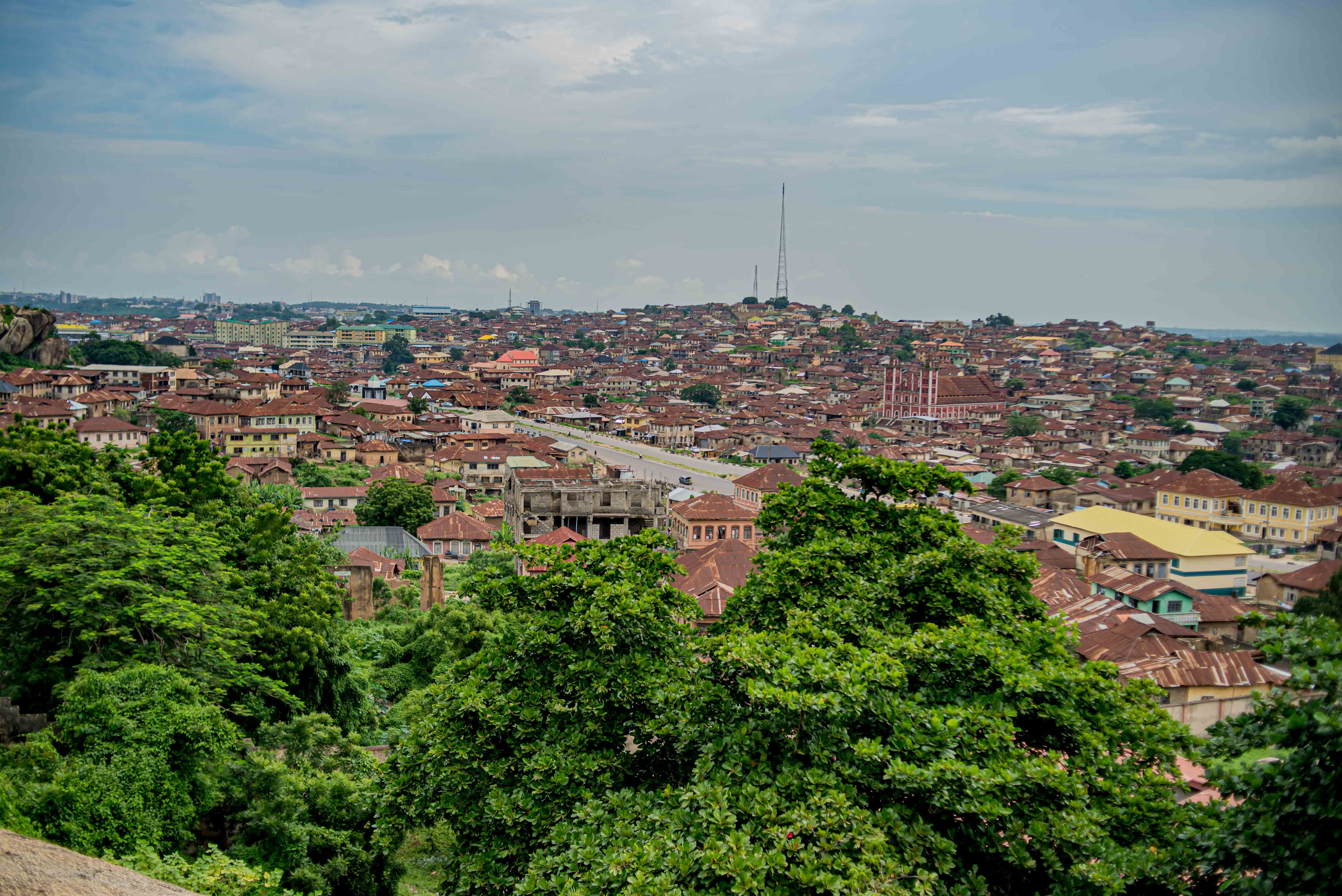
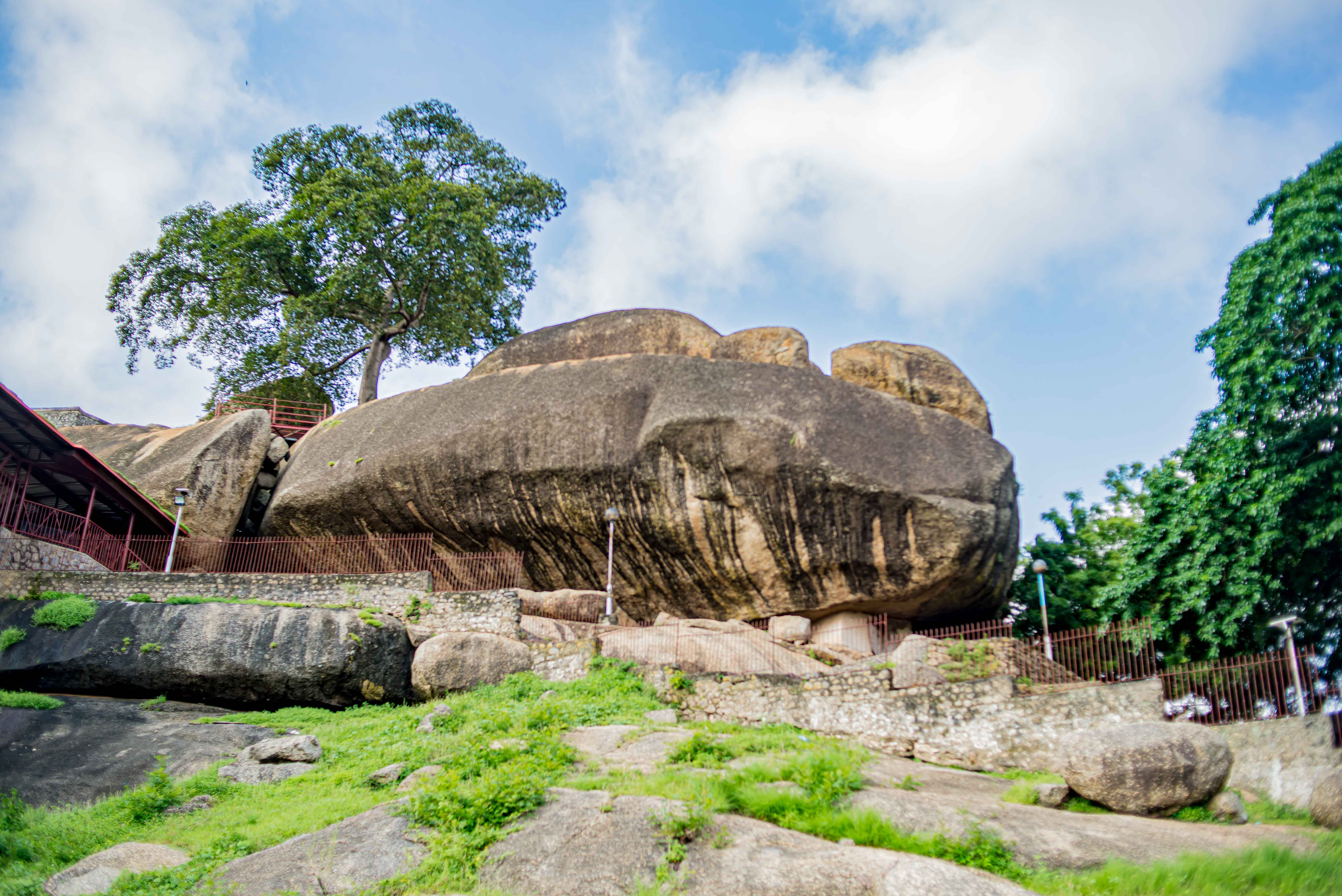
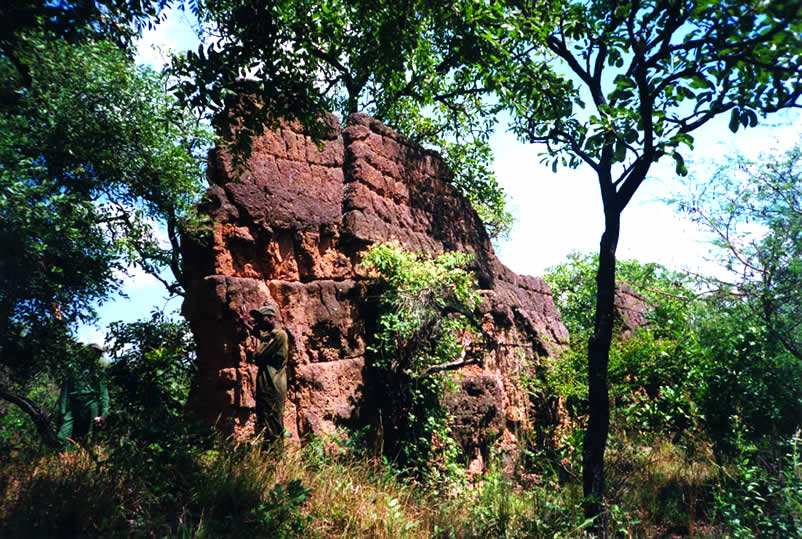
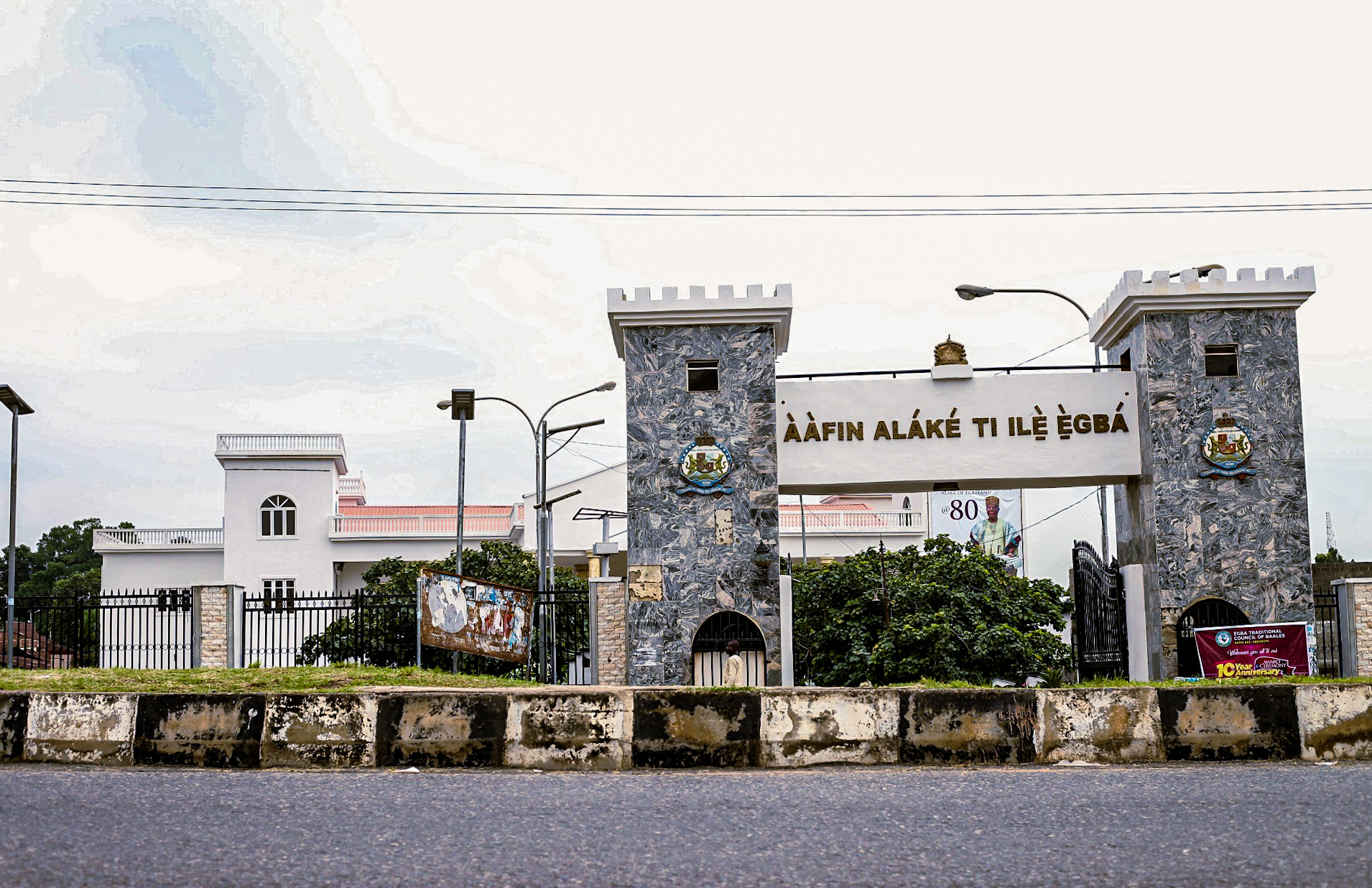
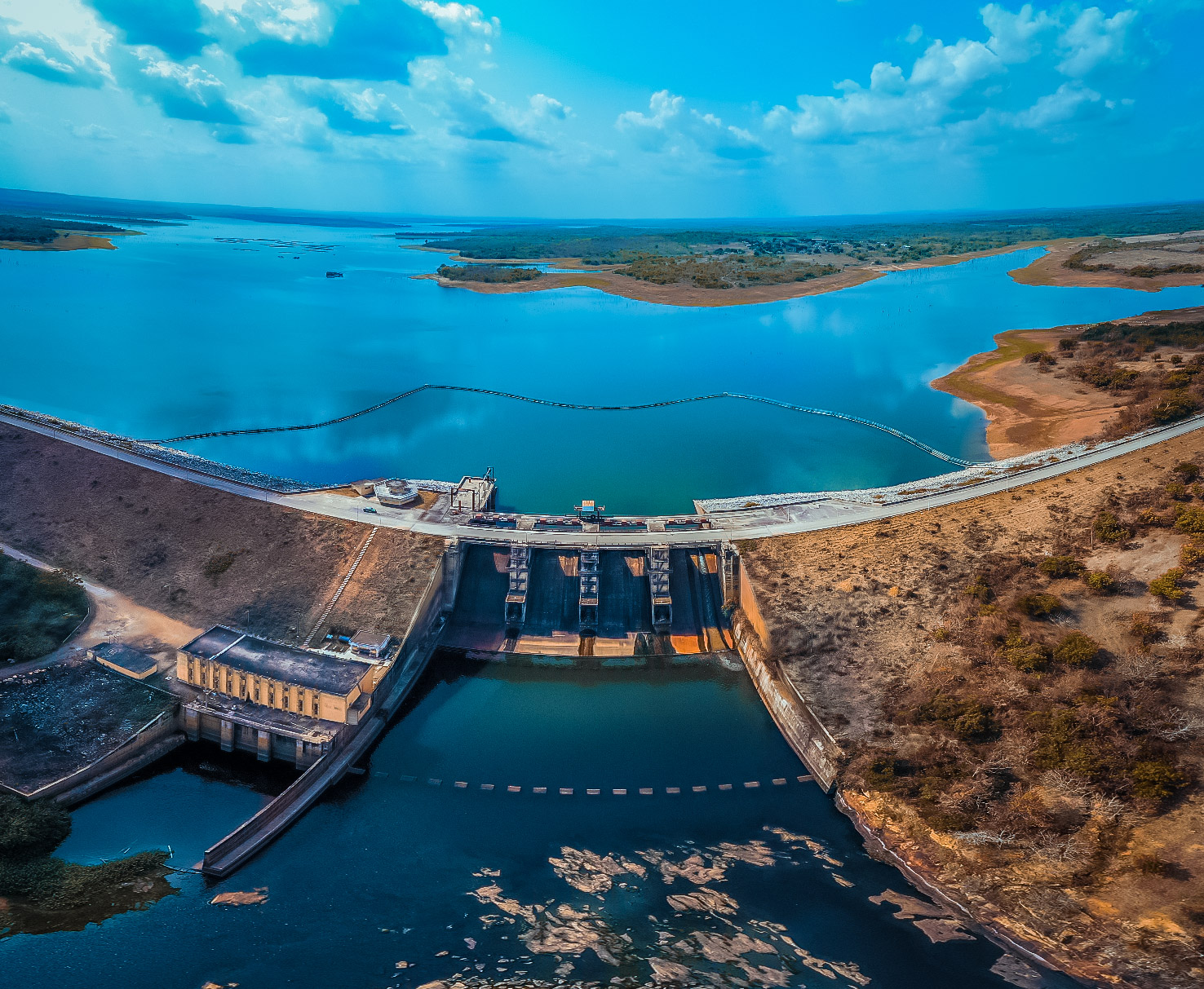
- Abeokuta Olumo Rock Sungbo's Eredo Ake Palace Oyan River Dam

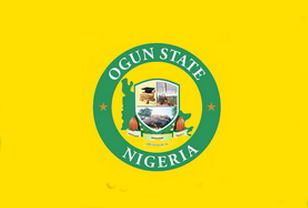
- Flag Seal
- Nicknames: Gateway State
- Location of Ogun State in Nigeria
- Coordinates: 7°7′12″N 3°22′21″E
- Country: Nigeria
- LGAs: 20
- Date created: 3 February 1976
- Capital: Abeokuta

Government
  - Body: Government of Ogun State
  - Governor: Dapo Abiodun (APC)
  - Deputy Governor: Noimot Salako-Oyedele (APC)
  - Legislature: Ogun State House of Assembly
  - Senators: C: Shuaibu Salisu (APC); E: Gbenga Daniel (APC); W: Solomon Adeola (APC)
  - Representatives: List

Area
  - Total: 16,980.55 km^{2} (6,556.23 sq mi)
  - Rank: 24th of 36

Population (2006 census)
  - Total: 3,751,140
  - Estimate (2022): 6,379,500
  - Rank: 11th of 36
  - Density: 220.908/km^{2} (572.149/sq mi)
- Demonym: Ogun

GDP (PPP)
  - Year: 2021
  - Total: $32.55 billion 8th of 36
  - Per capita: $5,288; 11th of 36
- Time zone: UTC+01 (WAT)
- postal code: 110001
- ISO 3166 code: NG-OG
- HDI (2022): 0.569 medium · 21st of 37
- Website: Official website

Ogun State (Yoruba: Ìpínlẹ̀ Ògùn [ìk͡pĩ́lɛ̀ ògũ̀]) is a state in southwestern Nigeria. It is bordered to the south by Lagos State and the Bight of Benin, to the east by Ondo State, and to the north by Oyo and Osun states while its western border forms part of the national border with the Republic of Benin. The capital and largest city is Abeokuta, and the state is divided into 20 local government areas.

Of the 36 states in the country, Ogun is the 24th largest in area but among the top fifteen most populous, with an estimated population of about 6.4 million as of 2020. Geographically, the state lies primarily in the tropical Nigerian lowland forests ecoregion, although parts of the state's north transition into the Guinean forest–savanna mosaic and some of the coastal south reach the Central African mangrove ecoregion. The Ogun and Yewa rivers are the state's major waterways while the Omo Forest Reserve in the southeastern part of the state is one of the most important conservation areas in the country—home to a variety of bird species along with some of Nigeria's last remaining Nigeria-Cameroon chimpanzee and African forest elephant populations.

Demographically, the Yoruba people are the largest ethnic group in the state—particularly the Awori, Egba, Ijebu, and Yewa subgroups, as well as smaller groups like the Ketu, Ohori, Ilaje, Ikale and Anago. Additionally, there are ethnic minorities of non-indigenous groups in urban areas and indigenous Egun people along the border with Benin. In terms of religion, the majority of the state's population are Christian with a significant Muslim minority.

Historically, parts of modern Ogun State were included in several kingdoms, including the Benin, Ijebu, and Oyo states. In the late nineteenth century, British expeditions took control of the area and Abeokuta became a major center of missionary activity and education. During the early colonial period, the area was part of the Southern Nigeria Protectorate, which later merged into colonial Nigeria. After independence in 1960, the region was part of the Western Region until the creation of Ogun State in 1976 from the old Western State.

Economically, Ogun State is a major industrial hub with a growing base of factories and companies, especially along the Lagos–Ibadan Expressway corridor. Agriculture remains vital in rural areas, with key crops including cassava, cocoa, and maize along with the indigenous Ofada rice. The state is also known for its cultural heritage, crafts, and textile traditions along with the arts. Ogun ranks in the mid-range in Human Development Index and has the eighth highest GDP in the country.

== History ==
In pre-colonial times, today's Ogun western portion which is now inhabited by the Egba and Yewa people belonged to the kingdom of Oyo, which sank into civil war mid 1800s. South of Ogun, on the tiny island of Lagos, the British had a naval base near which the town of the same name grew rapidly.

Until the Berlin Congo Conference in 1885, Great Britain had focused on a few strategically placed bases for its merchant fleet and navy, such as Lagos and Calabar, and was not interested in the communities developing there.

After the European colonial powers had staked out their spheres of interest 1885 in Berlin (these were only valid if another power had not previously brought the area in question under its control) the United Kingdom quickly expanded thusly its territory in the assigned Niger region. Today's Ogun became part of the "Protectorate of Lagos" (as opposed to the Colony of Lagos; the border between these two is identical to the modern border between Lagos State and Ogun State—inhabitants of a colony were treated as fully entitled subjects of the British crown, those in protectorates were not) in 1893 and later of the "Protectorate of Yorubaland", in 1906 of the "Protectorate of Southern Nigeria" and in 1914 of the whole of Nigeria. In 1899 it received a railway connection to Lagos, the "Boat Express" ran through Ogun to Apapa and thus connected the region with the wider world. In 1899, it was several years earlier in this than other regions in West and Central Africa that were not connected to the coast.

In the 1930s, Ogun was a centre of the Nigerian women's movement under the leadership of Funmilayo Ransome-Kuti (Fela Kuti's mother). Democracy in colonial Nigeria after 1922 only existed in Lagos and Calabar; Nigerians could not participate politically elsewhere (see here).

During the 1940s, food was strictly rationed in Nigeria. The transport of food from the more agrarian Ogun to the hungry metropolis of Lagos was severely penalized (Pullen Scheme, see here).

In the first elections in Ogun, 1954, the semi-socialist "Action Group" (AG) under Ọbáfẹ́mi Awólọ́wọ̀ became the strongest party in the Western Region, to which Ogun also belonged.

After independence in 1960, the Yoruba region, and Ogun in particular, was engulfed in conflict between the Ọbáfẹ́mi Awólọ́wọ̀ and Samuel Ládòkè Akíntọ́lá fractions of the AG party ("Operation Wetie", see here). In July 1966, the then ruler of Nigeria, Johnson Agulyi-Ironsi, was assassinated in Ibadan in the second coup of the year, which was the prelude to the Biafra War.

The state was formed on 3 February 1976 from part of the former "Western" state.

== Geography ==
Ogun State borders the Republic of Benin to the West for about 185 km, Oyo State and Osun State (for 84 km) to the North, Ondo State to the east, Lagos State to the South for about 283 km, and has 31.6 km of coastline on the Bight of Benin to the south, Araromi beach belongs to Irokun land in Ogun Waterside (Ijebu province) local government but insistently claimed by Ondo State due to the influx of Ilaje migrants from neighbouring communities and due to no attention given to this area by the Ogun state government.

=== Major rivers ===
- Ogun River
- Yewa River
- Osun River

=== Local government areas ===
Ogun State consists of twenty local government areas. They are:

LGA	Headquarter
Abeokuta North	Akọmọjẹ
Abeokuta South	Ake
Ado-Odo/Ota	Ọ̀tà
Ewekoro	Itori
Ifo	Ifo
Ijebu East	Ọ̀gbẹ̀rẹ̀
Ijebu North	Ìjẹ̀bú Igbó
Ijebu North East	Atan
Ijebu Ode	Ìjẹ̀bú-Òde
Ikenne	Ìkẹ́nnẹ́
Imeko Afon	Imẹkọ
Ipokia	Ipokia
Obafemi Owode	Owódé-Ẹ̀gbá
Odogbolu	Odògbólú
Odeda	Odẹda
Ogun Waterside	Abigi (Formerly Makun)
Remo North	Ode-Remo/Ìṣarà-Rẹ́mọ
Sagamu (Shagamu)	Ṣàgámù
Yewa North	Ayetoro
Yewa South	Ilaro

=== Climate ===
Ogun has a Tropical wet and dry or savanna climate. The city's yearly average temperature is 29.34 °C (84.81 °F) and it is -0.12% lower than Nigeria's averages. Ogun receives about 141.58 mm (5.574 in) of precipitation and has 224.18 rainy days (61.42% of the time) annually.

== Economy ==
The state has a very high concentration of industries (the second most industrialized after Lagos State) and has one of the lowest incidences of extreme poverty (around 5% of the population against a national average of 31%) according to World Bank data from 2018.

Major companies in Ogun include the Dangote Cement factory in Ibese, Nestle, Lafarge Cement factory in Ewekoro, Memmcol in Orimerunmu, Coleman Cables in Sagamu and Arepo, Procter & Gamble in Agbara. In September 2024, the Ogun State Government announced the establishment of a $5 million battery recycling plant by a British company. Ogun State in the first half of 2026 (January to June) is the second-best performing state based on internally generated revenue (IGR).

=== Primary sector ===
Mining and agriculture are among the most important economic sectors in Ogun. Limestone, chalk, phosphate and gravel are mined and grain, rice, maize, cassava, yams, bananas, cocoa, kola nuts, rubber, palm oil and palm kernels are harvested. The state is the largest producer of kolanut in Nigeria.

=== Mineral resources in Ogun State ===
The following are the mineral resources in Ogun State:

- Clay
- Limestone and Phosphate
- Bitumen
- Kaolin
- Gemstone
- Feldspar

=== Secondary sector, metal processing ===
Ogún is also the name of the god (Orisha) for metalworking in the local Yoruba nature religion, similar to the Greek Hephaestus or the Roman god Vulcan (since the ancient world had trade relations with present-day Nigeria, this may not be entirely coincidental). The state lives up to this name by being the Nigerian centre for metalworking. Here are two examples:

- Proforce manufactures armoured vehicles in Ode-Remo (25 km from Lagos), which are also sold to Europe. Since 2008, the company has expanded its product range and also produces drones for the security sector.
- The wagon assembly plant in Kajola is the only plant in West Africa that manufactures, maintains and repairs railway vehicles.

Ogun State also produces timber, ceramic products, bicycle tyres, carpets, adhesives and other products.

=== Tourist centers in Ogun state ===
- Olumo Rock
- Olusegun Obasanjo Presidential Library
- Omu Resort Abeokuta
- Oronna Shrine, Ilaro

== Politics ==
The State government is led by a democratically elected governor who works closely with members of the state's house of assembly. The capital city of the state is Abeokuta.

=== Electoral system ===
The governor of the state is selected using a modified two-round system. To be elected in the first round, a candidate must receive the plurality of the vote and over 25% of the vote in at least two -third of the State local government areas. If no candidate passes threshold, a second round will be held between the top candidate and the next candidate to have received a plurality of votes in the highest number of local government areas.

=== Governor ===
As of 2020, the governor was Prince Dapo Abiodun, a member of the All Progressives Congress (APC), who headed the Executive Council of Ogun State. On Wednesday 29 May 2019, Dapo Abiodun was sworn in as the fifth Governor of the State at the MKO Abiola Stadium, Kuto, Abeokuta. He was re-elected for a second term in office in March 2023.

=== Senatorial districts ===
Ogun State is divided into three senatorial districts:

- Ogun Central: Ogun Central consists mostly of the Egba that occupies six local governments: Abeokuta North (Akomoje), Abeokuta South (Ake), Ewekoro (Itori), Ifo (Ifo), Obafemi Owode (Owode ẹgba) and Odeda (Odeda).
- Ogun East: Ogun East consists mostly of the Ijebu and the Remo that occupies 9 local governments: Ijebu East (Ogbẹrẹ), Ijebu North (Ijebu Igbo), Ijebu North East (Attan), Ijebu ode (Ijebu ode), Ikenne (Ikenne Remo), Odogbolu (Odogbolu), Ogun waterside (Abigi), Remo North (Ilisan Remo) and Sagamu (Sagamu).
- Ogun West: Ogun West consists mostly of the Yewa that occupies 5 local governments: Ado odo Ota (Otta), Imeko Afon (Imeko), Ipokia (Ipokia), Yewa North (Ayetoro) and Yewa South (Ilaro).

== Demographics ==
The main ethnic groups in Ogun State are the Ẹgba, Ijebu, Remo, Yewa, Awori and a minority Egun people. There are also sub groups like the Ikale, the Ketu, the Ohori and the Anago.

Languages of Ogun State listed by LGA:

LGA	Languages
Abeokuta North	Yoruba; Egba, Yewa
Abeokuta South	Yoruba; Egba
Ado-Odo/Ota	Yoruba; Awori
Ewekoro	Yoruba; Egba
Ifo	Yoruba; Egba
Ijebu East	Yoruba; Ijebu
Ijebu North	Yoruba; Ijebu
Ijebu North East	Yoruba; Ijebu
Ijebu Ode	Yoruba; Ijebu
Ikenne	Yoruba; Remo, Ijebu
Imeko Afon	Gun/, Yoruba; Ketu, Ohori, Yewa
Ipokia	Gun, Yoruba; Anago, Awori/Eyo, Yewa
Obafemi Owode	Yoruba; Egba
Odogbolu	Yoruba; Ijebu
Odeda	Yoruba; Egba, Oyo
Ogun Waterside	Yoruba; Ijebu, Ikale, Ilaje
Remo North	Yoruba; Remo, Ijebu people
Yewa North	Yoruba; Ketu, Ohori, Yewa
Yewa South	Yoruba; Ketu, Ohori, Yewa
Sagamu	Yoruba; Remo, Ijebu

== Religion ==
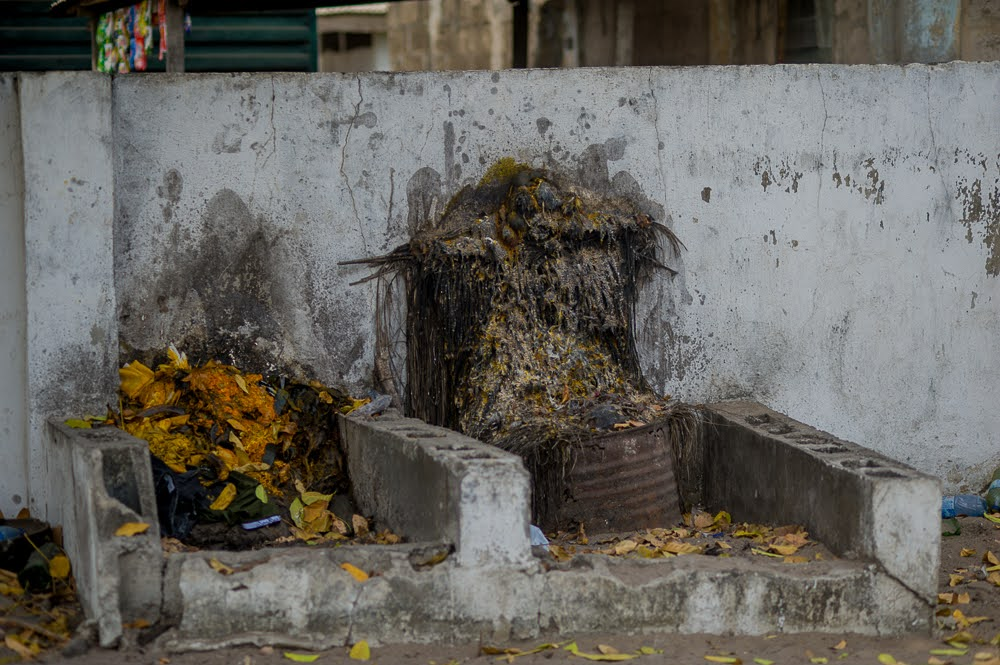
Shrine to the Orisha (god) of fire and metal works, Ogun

Residents of Ogun State are mainly Muslims and Christians, with some adhering to traditional Yoruba religion.

The Anglican Province of Lagos within the Church of Nigeria includes the ten Dioceses of Awori led by Bishop Johnson Akin Atere (2009), Egba (1976) led by Bishop Emmanuel Adekunle (2009), Egba West (2007) led by Bishop Samuel Oludele Ogundeji (2010), Ifo (2007) led by Bishop Nathaniel Oladejo Ogundipe (2012), Ijebu led by Bishop Peter Rotimi Oludipe (2020), Ijebu-North led by Bishop Solomon Kuponu (2005), Remo led by Bishop Michael Fape (2004, Archbishop of Lagos 2016–21), Yewa, formerly Egbado led by Bishop Michael Adebayo Oluwarohunbi (2014), and Ijebu-South West led by Bishop Babatunde Ogunbanwo (2009).

179,014 Catholics (2020) in the Dioceses of Abeokuta (1997) with 60 parishes under Bishop Peter Kayode Odetoyinbo (2014) and Ijebu-Ode (1969) with 40 parishes under Bishop Francis Obafemi Adesina (2019), both suffragans of the Archdiocese of Lagos.

=== Notable religious places ===
- Bilikisu Sungbo Shrine, Oke-Eiri, near Ijebu-Ode. It was declared a part of the national heritage in 1964, and is believed by the Ijebus to be the burial place of the fabled Queen of Sheba. It serves as a place of pilgrimage for Yoruba traditionalists, Yoruba Muslims and Yoruba Christians alike.
- Celestial City, (Imeko, Ogun State, Nigeria)
- Christ Embassy Camp Ground, (Asese, off Lagos-Ibadan Expressway, Obafemi-Owode LGA)
- Church of the Lord (Aladura), Ogere Remo
- Deeper Life Conference Centre (DLCC) and Camp Ground, (Km. 42, Lagos-Ibadan Expressway)
- Foursquare Camp, (Ajebo, Ogun State, Nigeria)
- Gospel City, (Lagos-Ibadan Expressway)
- Living Faith Church Worldwide, (Canaanland, Km. 10, Idiroko Road, Ota, Ogun State, Nigeria)
- MFM Prayer City (Lagos Ibadan Express Road)
- NASFAT Annual Lailatul Qadr, (Lagos-Ibadan Expressway)
- Redemption City (Lagos Ibadan Express Road)

== Education ==
Ogun state has three federal secondary schools; Federal Government Girls' College, Sagamu and Federal Government College, Odogbolu and Federal Science and Technical College, Ijebu-Imushin.

Ogun state has two Federal Universities; the Federal University of Agriculture, Abeokuta (FUNAAB) and Tai Solarin University of Education, Ijebu Ode and one Federal college of education, FCE Osiele (both at Odeda Local government area), one state government college of education, named after the late Nigerian educationist of international repute Augustus Taiwo Solarin in 1994 as Tai Solarin College of Education (TASCE), (formerly known as Ogun State College of Education, Ijagun, Ijebu-Ode, one Federal Polytechnic, Ilaro). One is named after late Nigerian business mogul and winner of 12 June 1993 election, Basorun Moshood Kasimawo Olawale Abiola as Moshood Abiola Polytechnic (MAPOLY), formerly known as Ogun State Polytechnic, Ojere, Abeokuta, Another Gateway Polytechnic Saapade, Remo (GAPOSA), Abraham Adesanya Polytechnic Ijebu-Igbo (Aapoly) (formerly known as 'The Polytechnic Ijebu-Igbo) it was name after Chief Abraham Aderibigbe Adesanya who was a Nigerian politician, lawyer and activist.

One state government universities: Olabisi Onabanjo University, Ago Iwoye (formerly known as Ogun State University).

Ogun State has a total of nine registered universities, the highest of any state in Nigeria. It has five private universities. Amongst which are Chrisland University, Hallmark University in Ijebu-itele, Abeokuta Bells University of Technology in Ota, Covenant University and Babcock University in Ilisan-Remo, which was the first private university in the country.

The state has two major government hospitals: the Federal Medical Center at Abeokuta, and the Olabisi Onabanjo University Teaching Hospital in Sagamu. The National Youth Service Corps (NYSC) Permanent Orientation Camp is located at Sagamu Local Government area of the state.

Ogun State government has begun the Itele road.

=== Tertiary institutions ===
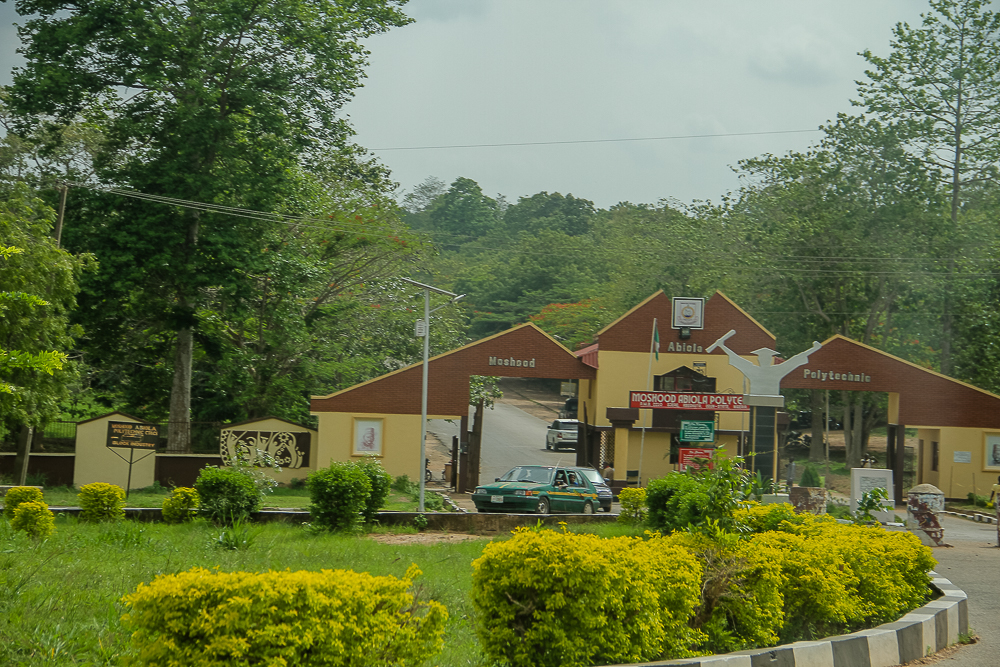
Moshood Abiola Polytechnic entrance gate, Abeokuta, Ogun state

- Babcock University, Ilisan Remo
- Bells University of Technology, Ota
- Chrisland University, Abeokuta
- Christopher University, Lagos Ibadan ExpressWay Makun, Sagamu
- Covenant University, Ota
- Crawford University, Igbesa
- Crescent University, Abeokuta
- Federal Polytechnic, Ilaro
- Federal University of Agriculture, Abeokuta
- Hallmark University, Ijebu Itele
- McPherson University, Seriki-Sotayo
- Moshood Abiola Polytechnic, Ojere
- Mountain Top University, Lagos-Ibadan Expressway
- National Open University of Nigeria, Kobape, Abeokuta
- Ogun State College of Health Technology, Ilese, Ijebu Ode
- Olabisi Onabanjo University, Ago Iwoye
- Tai Solarin University of Education, Ijagun, Ijebu-Ode

=== Think tanks ===
- African Centre for Development and Strategic Studies (ACDESS)

== Transportation ==
Ogun benefits from its proximity to the metropolis of Lagos and the new deep-sea harbour and the new Dangote refinery in Lekki (as of 2024). The planned airport Lagos-Epe will be located next to the border to the state of Ogun.

=== Railways ===
==== Nigerian Railway Company ====
Ogun benefits from the Lagos-Abeokuta-Ibadan standard rail link since 2021.

The planned Apapa-Kajola Express will connect the centre of the state with the Lagos port.

Abeokuta also is connected with Lagos by 77 km of the Western Railway (built in 1899), which still is used for freight trains.

==== Lagos Mass Transit (Lamata) ====
The terminus of the "Red Line" of the Lagos suburban railway is located in Agbado, which is part of the Lagos agglomeration but belongs to the state of Ogun in administrative terms. This is why the trains and carriages of Lagos State will be parked, cleaned and maintained in Ogun.

=== Airport ===
The Ogun State Governor, Dapo Abiodun on 7 October 2025 inaugurated the first commercial flight of the Gateway International Airport in Ilishan-Remo. The airport plans to fly passengers internationally. An aircraft owned by the airline ValueJet, with registration number 5N-BXS and 90 passengers on board, departed the airport at 10:10 a.m. for Abuja as the first commercial flight to officially fly from the airport.

=== Roads ===
Federal Highways are:

- A1 north from Lagos as part of the African Unity Road TAH2 Trans-African Highway 2,
- E1 Lagos-Ibadan Expressway north to Oyo State,
- A5 north from Lagos via Abeokuta and east to Oyo State at Omin Adio,
- A121 east from A1 in Sagamu as the Benin-Sagamu Expressway via Ijebu-Ode to Ondo State at Kajola as part of the Trans-African 8 (TAH 8) Lagos-Mombasa Highway.

Three roads to the Republic of Benin:

- the Sango Ota-Idi-Iroko Rd at Idiroko as part of the Lagos-Badagry-Porto Novo highway west to RNIE 1,
- the Oja-Odan Road from Ilaro at Obelle to RN3 in Pobè,
- F102 west from Sagamu via Abeokuta to Meko at Idofa to RNIE 4 to Kétou.

Other major roads include:

- the Epe-Ijebu-Ode Rd south from Sagamu to Lagos State at Agboju,
- the Iken-Sekungba Rd south from the Awa-Itokin Rd from Egbe to Lagos State at Omu,
- the Agbara-Atan Rd south from Atan to Lagos State at Morogbo,
- the Abeokuta-Igboora-Iseyin Rd north from the Ayetoro Rd at Rounda Roundabout to Oyo State as the Ibara-Orile-Ijeun Rd,
- the Ibadan-Eruwa Rd west from A5 at Ilugun to Oyo State at Olokemeji,
- the Ibadan-Ijebu-Ode Rd north from Ilaporu to Oyo State at Mamu,
- the Ibadan-Ijebu-Igbo Rd northeast from Ilaporu to Oyo State at Olugbuyi.

== Notable people ==
- Abraham Adesanya (1922–2008), politician
- Adebayo Adedeji (1930–2018), economist
- Adebayo Ogunlesi (b. 1953), lawyer, investment banker
- Adegboyega Dosunmu Amororo II, film producer, Olowu of Owu kingdom
- Adewale Oke Adekola
- Afolabi Olabimtan
- Anthony Joshua
- Aṣa, singer
- Babafemi Ogundipe
- Babatunde Osotimehin
- Bisi Onasanya
- Bola Ajibola
- Bola Kuforiji Olubi
- Bosun Tijani (b. 1977), Entrepreneur
- Cornelius Taiwo
- Dapo Abiodun
- David Alaba, son of George Alaba, a prince of Ogere Remo
- Dimeji Bankole
- Ebenezer Obey, jùjú musician
- Ernest Shonekan
- Fela Kuti (1938–1997), multi-instrumentalist, bandleader, composer, political activist, Pan-Africanist
- Fireboy DML, singer
- Femi Okurounmu, politician
- Fola Adeola
- Senator Solomon Adeola, politician., businessman, politician
- Funmilayo Ransome-Kuti (1900–1978), educator, women's rights activist
- Funke Akindele (b. 1977), Actress
- Gbenga Daniel (b. 1956), politician
- Hannah Idowu Dideolu Awolowo (1915–2015), businesswoman and politician
- Hubert Ogunde (1916–1990), actor, playwright, theatre manager and musician
- Ibikunle Amosun (b. 1958), politician, senator, Governor of Ogun State in 2011–2019
- Idowu Sofola (1934–1982), jurist, President of the Nigerian Bar Association in 1980–1982
- Joseph Adenuga (b. 1982), aka Skepta, British musician and record producer
- Prof. Lateef Akinola Salako CON, professor emeritus of pharmacology and therapeutics
- Jubril Martins-Kuye (b. 1942), politician
- K1 De Ultimate (b. 1957), Fuji musician
- Kehinde Sofola (1924–2007), jurist
- Kemi Adeosun (b. 1967), former Finance Minister of Nigeria
- Kizz Daniel, singer
- Kunle Soname, Entrepreneur, Politician
- Laycon (b. 1993), professional name of Olamilekan Moshood Agbeleshe, reality TV personality, rapper, singer and songwriter
- Lukmon Atobatele, legislator
- Mike Adenuga
- Moshood Abiola
- Mr Macaroni, content creator, actor
- Oba Otudeko (b. 1943), businessman
- Obafemi Awolowo (1909–1987)
- Ola Rotimi
- Olabisi Onabanjo
- Oladipo Diya
- Olamide
- Olawunmi Banjo
- Olu Oyesanya
- Olusegun Obasanjo
- Olusegun Osoba
- Oreoluwa Osoba (Oga Duke)
- Paul Adefarasin
- Peter Akinola
- Rueben Abati
- Salawa Abeni
- Sarah Forbes Bonetta
- Tai Solarin (1922–1994), educator, author, civil rights activist
- Thomas Adeoye Lambo (1923–2004), scholar, administrator, psychiatrist, Deputy Director General of the World Health Organization
- Tomi Favored, gospel artiste
- Tunde Kelani, entrepreneur, film producer
- Tunde Bakare (b. 1954), Prophetic-Apostolic pastor, politician
- Tunji Olurin (b. 1944), retired general
- Wizkid, singer
- Wole Soyinka (b. 1934), 1986 The Nobel Prize for Literature laureate
- Yemi Osinbajo (b. 1957), politician, lawyer
- Dj Chicken (b. 1995), Nigerian disc jockey
