= Anglican Province of Lagos =

Anglican province in Nigeria

The Ecclesiastical Province of Lagos is one of the 14 ecclesiastical provinces of the Church of Nigeria. It comprises 13 dioceses:

- Lagos (Bishop: Ifedola Senasu Gabriel Okupevi)
- Awori (Bishop: Akin Atere)
- Badagry (Bishop: Joseph Adeyemi)
- Egba (Bishop: Emmanuel Adekunle)
- Egba West (Bishop: Samuel Ajani)
- Ifo (Bishop: Nathaniel Oladejo Ogundipe)
- Ijebu (Bishop: Peter Rotimi Oludipe)
- Ijebu-North (Bishop: Solomon Kuponu)
- Lagos Mainland (Bishop: Akinpelu Johnson)
- Lagos West (Bishop: James Odedeji)
- Remo (Bishop: Michael Fape)
- Yewa, formerly Egbado (Bishop: Michael Adebayo Oluwarohunbi)
- Ijebu Southwest (Bishop: Babatunde Ogunbanwo)

== History of the Anglican church in Lagos ==
The evangelical movements of the 18th century gave rise to many missionary societies such as that of the Baptist (1792), "the joint efforts" (1795) and Church Missionary Society — CMS (1799). Closely related to them was the birth of the British and Foreign Bible Society (1804) and the CMS-inspired founding of the West African Mission in the same year. There was also the Niger Expedition of 1841 which was a response by both the Church Missionary Society and Wesleyan Missionary Society to evangelise newly freed slaves in Freetown, Sierra Leone.

The seed of the Anglican Church in Lagos was planted by the activities of liberated Africans in Sierra Leone and the CMS, an evangelical society within the Anglican community in Great Britain. CMS was founded in 1799 by evangelicals during a period of Evangelical Revival in Great Britain and members soon developed a plan to establish missionary activities in Africa.

=== Badagry outpost ===
In 1809, CMS commenced missionary activities among the liberated African community of Sierra Leone, many of whom were originally Yoruba, Hausa, Efik and Igbo of present-day Nigeria. Many of the liberated Africans converted to Christianity and as early as 1838, some began to return to their original homeland. Among those Africans who returned and settled in Nigeria where converts who wanted a Christian mission amidst them. Returnees who settled in Abeokuta wrote a petition to the CMS mission in Sierra Leone for a new station in Abeokuta.

Henry Townsend, a CMS missionary priest, and Birch Freeman, of the Wesleyan Missionary Society, were sent to survey Badagry, giving a joint service of Eucharist and thanksgiving on Christmas Day 1842. After completing his mission, Townsend wrote a favorable report about extending missionary activities to Abeokuta. A set of missionaries was sent in 1845, the group landed in Badagry where many stayed to establish a mission while some continued the journey to Abeokuta. Among those who stayed at Badagry was a German Lutheran presbyter names Gollmer.

After the fall of Lagos to British colonists, the British consul felt cooperation with missionaries and legitimate goods traders was important to the success of the abolition of slavery in Lagos. An invitation was sent to the CMS mission in Badagry to come and preach in Lagos. An African, James White was the first catechist sent to Lagos by CMS. In January 1852, White held an outreach event at Iga Idunganran that included Akitoye, many of his chiefs and residents, he later chose a site at Ebute Ero and built a bamboo structure to preach the gospel.

=== Move to Lagos ===
Early missionaries such as Henry Townsend, Charles Andrew Gollmer and Samuel Ajayi Crowther gave rise to the Yoruba Mission. Gollmer was made Deacon in 1841, and priest the same year. By July 1852, the mission at Badagry moved to Lagos which was considered an important location to spread the gospel; among those from Badagry who moved to Lagos were Gollmer and Ajayi Crowther. Gollmer obtained land rights to five sites from Oba Akitoye and chose White's Ebute Ero post as the first site of a CMS station. The mission became part of Diocese of Sierra Leone led by Bishop Owen Vidal. In London, an act of parliament, the Bishops in Foreign Countries Act 1841 granted ability to create Anglican bishops in non-British territories and confirmation of communicants by those bishops, CMS led by its secretary, Henry Venn began making plans to make the missions an extension of the English Church and on a path towards self-sustenance under administrations of a local Bishop and Diocesan Synod.

Between 1852 and 1854, the Lagos mission led by Gollmer and Crowther created out-stations including one at an old slave barracoon where slaves were tied to breadfruit trees before their journey to the new world and another post at Oko Faji. After Gollmer and Crowther left Ebute Ero, they chose the breadfruit post as their station. In 1852, Gollmer completed a mission house at Ehin Igbeti, Marina that was constructed from pre-fabricated materials brought from Badagry, the long distance between the Mission House and the Breadfruit Church affected Gollmer's attendance at Breadfruit which was being managed by Crowther . Gollmer later chose a site at Oko-Faji close to Marina as a new mission post. Henry Townsend later led a congregation of English and Yoruba people at St Peters/Holy Trinity Church of Oko-Faji. An outpost of this mission moved to Marina at a new building called Christ Church.

=== Massive diocese ===
In 1856, Crowther was appointed to lead a missionary expedition along the Niger and left the Lagos mission. Crowther was consecrated a bishop in London on 29 June 1864 and served as Bishop of Western Equatorial Africa. Crowther had founded the All-African Mission in 1847, and headed it until his death in 1891. Following Crowther's death, the CMS home office (secretariat) in London chose Joseph Sidney Hill as successor instead of any of the more suitable Africans, nearly all of whom were already serving as Assistant Bishops. Among them were Archdeacons James Johnson, Henry Johnson, Dandeson Crowther (son of the late bishop), James Quaker, Isaac Oluwole and Charles Phillips. Hill assumed leadership and invited Oluwole, Adolphus Howells and Phillips to be his Assistant Bishops.

In 1894, Herbert Tugwell was consecrated Bishop of West Equatorial Africa, and James Johnson became a "half-bishop". There was a sub-division into two of what was the still the Diocese of Western Equatorial Africa. On 10 October 1919, the Nigerian country, West and North of the Niger were cut off from the Diocese to form the new Diocese of Lagos. F. Melville Jones, a European Missionary educationist and Principal of St Andrew's College, was consecrated as the first Bishop of Lagos. The remaining part — east of the country, was renamed Diocese on the Niger. Its formal inauguration took place on 5 March 1920 with Tugwell remaining as first bishop.

=== Old Lagos diocese ===
F. Melville Jones served as Bishop of Lagos from 1919 to 1940, and was succeeded by Assistant Bishop of the Diocese on the Niger Leslie Gordon Vining. On 17 April 1951 at the inauguration of the Province of West Africa, Vining was elected and presented as the first Archbishop of the new Province (i.e. of all West Africa). Under him, Lagos and Niger dioceses were divided to create four more dioceses (Niger Delta, Ibadan, Kaduna and Ondo inaugurated in 1952). Vining died at sea in March 1955 and was succeeded by Adelakun Howells. Then following in succession, the episcopacy of Seth Irunsewe Kale from 1963 to 1974; Festus Oluwole Segun from January 1975 to 1985 and Joseph Abiodun Adetiloye from 1985 to 1999.

From 2000 to 2018, the Diocese of Lagos has led by Ephraim Ademowo as both Bishop and Archbishop of Province 1 (comprising all the dioceses geographically located in the Southwest and Midwest areas of the country). In 2008, he was re-elected for another 5-year term as Archbishop of the Ecclesiastical Province of Lagos.

=== Growth ===
The Lagos Pastorate Association came into being in 1876, as part of a movement to organize the local Anglican community to be a self reliant Church. The association and churches in Lagos took on missionary activities spreading the gospel to Ijebu and Remo land.

==== Churches ====
- Holy Trinity, Ebute Ero. After Gollmer moved from Badagry to Lagos, he chose James White's bamboo post at Ebute Ero as CMS's first mission post in Lagos. In 1861, a church building was erected but was burnt in a great fire that affected Lagos in 1877. Many of the earliest Churches built by the Anglican community under Gollmer introduced Gothic architecture to Lagos. A building that later became a school was constructed in 1878. In 1926, the congregation contributed funds to erect a new church building. Holy Trinity was the first church in Lagos to be self-sustaining, ceasing to receive funds from the parent CMS in 1876. Noted preachers of the church included T.A.J. Ogunbiyi, Timothy Olufosoye, S. Pearse and Aiyedun.
- St John's Aroloya was located in a sand-filled area of Lagos. For a long time, the church was led by a priest named Faulkner who at times was relieved from pastorate duties by visiting European missionaries. It became a pastorate church in 1879 with Nathaniel Johnson appointed as the first pastor. A church structure was built in 1892 and commissioned by a Sierra Leonian priest named Ingham. The church had an adjacent school attached to it and historically produced many pastorate members of the Lagos diocese.
- St Paul's, Breadfruit was Ajayi Crowther mission post from 1852 to 1856, between 1862 and 1872, it had a European pastor, Lancelot Nicholson. A church building was erected in 1879 and rebuilt in 1924. In 1880, it was led by James "Holy" Johnson, an enigmatic preacher who briefly rose to prominence within the Lagos Pastorate Association from 1881 to 1885. A cultural nationalist, Johnson was effective in expanding the Anglican community and promoting an independent African Church. In 1901, large number of his congregation left to form an independent African Church but Johnson stayed within the Anglican community. Breadfruit was chosen as the name of the area because of the abundance of breadfruit trees, during the Atlantic Slave Trade, captured Africans were tied to the Breadfruit trees before their onward voyage to the Americas. Among those who passed through this slave barracoon was Ajayi Crowther.
- St Jude's Ebute Metta history can be traced to the flight of liberated Africans from Abeokuta between 1867 and 1869.
- Christ Church Cathedral developed out of St Peter's Church at Oko-Faji. The Oko-Faji church catered to Yoruba and English speaking congregation. A desire to have an English speaking church led to the construction of a new church at Marina that was dedicated in 1869. It was last of the early Churches built in Lagos to be independent of the parent's CMS direction.

== Archbishops of the Province ==
The first archbishop of the province was Ephraim Ademowo, who served from the creation of the province of Lagos in 2002 until 2012; Ademowo was also Bishop of Lagos and a former Bishop of Ilesa and had served as the only Archbishop of Province 1 (i.e. Lagos) since the three provinces were erected in 2000. He was re-elected in 2007 and succeeded by Adebayo Akinde, Bishop of Lagos Mainland, from January 2013 until he retired in August 2016. The third archbishop was Michael Fape, Bishop of Remo, who was presented on 24 July 2016 and served for one five-year term. The current Archbishop is Humphrey Bamisebi Olumakaiye, Bishop of Lagos, who was presented on 7 November 2021 at the Cathedral Church of the Advent, Life Camp, Abuja.

== Diocese of Lagos ==
=== Bishops of Lagos ===
- 1919–1940: F. Melville Jones was the first Bishop of Lagos; as such he led the entire Diocese which stretched as far as Kano in the North and entire West and Mid-West. He had previously served as Principal of St Andrew's College, Oyo from 1894 to 1907.
- 1940–1955: Leslie Gordon Vining (also Archbishop of Province of West Africa, 1951–1955). He was previously the Assistant Bishop of the Diocese on the Niger. On 17 April 1951, at the inauguration of the Province of West Africa, Leslie Vining was elected and presented as the first Archbishop of the new Province. In 1952, he divided Lagos diocese into four: Lagos, Ibadan, Ondo-Benin and Northern Nigeria; and the Diocese on the Niger into two parts — on the Niger and Niger Delta. He died at sea in March 1955.
- 1955–1963: Adelakun Williamson Howells II. He replaced the wooden, rickety bungalow that has served as Bishop's court with a multi-storey building, the foundation of which was laid on 1 December 1959 and completed on 24 September 1960. He also relocated the CMS Grammar School from central Lagos Island to a more spacious site in Bariga.
- 1963–1975: Seth Irunsewe Kale. Formerly Principal of CMS Grammar School for five years; the Dean of Anglican Schools and Colleges in 1949; the Principal of St Andrew's Teacher Training College, Oyo. During his tenure, alterations were made in the interior of the Cathedral Church of Christ, Lagos.
- 1975–1985: Festus Segun. Provost of the Cathedral Church of Christ, Lagos, 1960–1970; Bishop of Northern Nigeria, 1970–1975. He initiated a Continuing Education Programme for the Clergy through the initiative of a Board for the Continuing Education of the Clergy (BOCEC).
- 1985–1999: Joseph Abiodun Adetiloye. He became the Primate of all Nigeria, 1988–1999. Previously Bishop of Ekiti, 1970–1985. He established the Lagos Anglican Bible College (LABICO); while he was Primate the number of Dioceses in Nigeria increased from 26 to 76.
- 2000–2018: Ephraim Ademowo. Dean Emeritus of the Church of Nigeria. Archbishop of Province One comprising all the dioceses geographically located in the Southwest and Midwest, Province 1 (Supra Diocesan Board West) of the Church of Nigeria (Anglican Communion), 2000–2002; then archbishop of its replacement province, 2002–2012. In 2008, he was re-elected for another 5-year term as Archbishop of the Ecclesiastical Province of Lagos.
- 2018–present: Humphrey Bamisebi Olumakaiye. He built several structures in what culminated into an Anglican village in Otan-Ayegbaju, Osun State.

== Assistant bishops ==
Isaac Oluwole was consecrated bishop in 1893, to serve as assistant bishop of the Diocese of Western Equatorial Africa (after 1920, the Diocese of Lagos).

Alfred William Smith (1875 – 8 September 1958) served as Assistant Bishop in Northern Nigeria (Diocese of Lagos) from 1925 until 1942; as assistant bishop for the north of the diocese, he was a forerunner of the Bishops of Northern Nigeria. Smith graduated from Christ's College, Cambridge and was ordained in 1902 to a title (curacy) at St John's, Lowestoft. Later that year, he went to Nigeria as a missionary for the Church Missionary Society (CMS); he was priest-in-charge of Christ Church, Lagos, then worked further inland. From 1915 to 1925 He was secretary for CMS's Mission to the Yorbua, 1915–1925; and from 1920 to 1925 Archdeacon of the Yoruba country for the Diocese of Lagos. He left both posts upon his consecration in 1925 to serve as Assistant Bishop. After resigning from his Nigerian post in 1942, Smith was appointed Vicar of Ford, Shropshire and an Assistant Bishop of Hereford; he served in those posts until 1947, when he became Chaplain of Addenbrooke's Hospital, Cambridge. From 1949 until his retirement in December 1957, he was Rector of Kirk Ireton, Derbyshire.

Norman Sherwood Jones (23 April 1911 – 8 March 1951) served as Assistant Bishop of Lagos from his consecration until his death. He was made deacon at Michaelmas 1935 (22 September) and ordained priest the following Michaelmas (20 September 1936) — both times by Thomas Strong, Bishop of Oxford, at Christ Church Cathedral, Oxford. Previously Vicar of St Nicholas' Church, Radford, Coventry since 1941, Sherwood-Jones was consecrated a bishop on the Feast of the Conversion of Paul the Apostle 1944 (25 January) at Westminster Abbey by William Temple, Archbishop of Canterbury; Norman was the son of Thomas Sherwood Jones, Bishop of Hulme. At the time of his consecration (aged 32), he was the youngest Anglican bishop in the world; he died of typhoid fever aged 39.
