= Anglican Diocese of Lagos =

Anglican diocese in Nigeria

The Anglican Diocese of Lagos is one of 13 dioceses within the Anglican Province of Lagos, itself one of 14 ecclesiastical provinces within the Church of Nigeria. The current bishop is the Right Rev. Ifedola Senasu Gabriel Okupevi who succeeded the late Humphrey Bamisebi Olumakaiye.

== History ==
The evangelical movements of the 18th Century gave rise to many missionary societies such as that of the Baptist (1792), "the joint efforts" (1795) and Church Missionary Society — CMS (1799). Closely related to them was the birth of the British and Foreign Bible Society (1804) and the CMS-inspired founding of the West African Mission in the same year. There was also the Niger Expedition of 1841 which was a response by both the Church Missionary Society and Wesleyan Missionary Society to evangelise newly freed slaves in Freetown, Sierra Leone.

Henry Townsend of the CMS and Birch Freeman of the Wesleyan Missionary Society made exploratory visits to Badagry in 1842, giving a joint service of Eucharist and thanksgiving on Christmas Day 1842.

Early missionaries such as Henry Townsend, Charles Andrew Gollmer and Samuel Ajayi Crowther gave rise to the Yoruba Mission. Gollmer was made Deacon in 1841, and priest the same year. Samuel Ajayi Crowther was consecrated a bishop in London on 29 June 1864 and served as Bishop of Western Equatorial Africa. Crowther had founded the All-African Mission in 1847, and headed it until his death in 1891. Following Crowther's death, the CMS home office (secretariat) in London chose Joseph Sidney Hill as successor instead of any of the more suitable Africans, nearly all of whom were already serving as Assistant Bishops. Among them were Archdeacons James Johnson, Henry Johnson, Dandeson Crowther (son of the late bishop), James Quaker, Isaac Oluwole and Charles Phillips. Hill assumed leadership and invited Oluwole, Adolphus Howells and Phillips to be his Assistant Bishops.

In 1894, Herbert Tugwell was consecrated Bishop of West Equatorial Africa, and James Johnson became a "half-bishop". There was a sub-division into two of what was the still the Diocese of Western Equatorial Africa. On 10 October 1919, the Nigerian country, West and North of the Niger were cut off from the Diocese to form the new Diocese of Lagos. F. Melville Jones, a European Missionary educationist and Principal of St Andrew's College, was consecrated as the first Bishop of Lagos. The remaining part — east of the country, was renamed Diocese on the Niger. Its formal inauguration took place on 5 March 1920 with Tugwell remaining as first bishop.

F. Melville Jones served as Bishop of Lagos from 1919 to 1940, and was succeeded by Assistant Bishop of the Diocese on the Niger Leslie Gordon Vining. On 17 April 1951 at the inauguration of the Province of West Africa, Vining was elected and presented as the first Archbishop of the new Province (i.e. of all West Africa). Under him, Lagos and Niger dioceses were divided to create four more dioceses (Niger Delta, Ibadan, Kaduna and Ondo inaugurated in 1952). Vining died at sea in March 1955 and was succeeded by Adelakun Howells. Then following in succession, the episcopacy of Seth Irunsewe Kale from 1963 to 1974; Festus Oluwole Segun from January 1975 to 1985 and Joseph Abiodun Adetiloye from 1985 to 1999.

From 2000 to 2018, the Diocese of Lagos has led by Ephraim Ademowo as both Bishop and Archbishop of Province 1 (comprising all the dioceses geographically located in the Southwest and Midwest areas of the country). In 2008, he was re-elected for another 5-year term as Archbishop of the Ecclesiastical Province of Lagos.

== Bishops of Lagos ==
- 1919–1940: F. Melville Jones was the first Bishop of Lagos; as such he led the entire Diocese which stretched as far as Kano in the North and entire West and Mid-West. He had previously served as Principal of St Andrew's College, Oyo from 1894 to 1907.
- 1940–1955: Leslie Gordon Vining (also Archbishop of Province of West Africa, 1951–1955). He was previously the Assistant Bishop of the Diocese on the Niger. On 17 April 1951, at the inauguration of the Province of West Africa, Leslie Vining was elected and presented as the first Archbishop of the new Province. In 1952, he divided Lagos diocese into four: Lagos, Ibadan, Ondo-Benin and Northern Nigeria; and the Diocese on the Niger into two parts — on the Niger and Niger Delta. He died at sea in March 1955.
- 1955–1963: Adelakun Williamson Howells II. He replaced the wooden, rickety bungalow that has served as Bishop's court with a multi-storey building, the foundation of which was laid on 1 December 1959 and completed on 24 September 1960. He also relocated the CMS Grammar School from central Lagos Island to a more spacious site in Bariga.
- 1963–1975: Seth Irunsewe Kale. Formerly Principal of CMS Grammar School for five years; the Dean of Anglican Schools and Colleges in 1949; the Principal of St Andrew's Teacher Training College, Oyo. During his tenure, alterations were made in the interior of the Cathedral Church of Christ, Lagos.
- 1975–1985: Festus Segun. Provost of the Cathedral Church of Christ, Lagos, 1960–1970; Bishop of Northern Nigeria, 1970–1975. He initiated a Continuing Education Programme for the Clergy through the initiative of a Board for the Continuing Education of the Clergy (BOCEC).
- 1985–1999: Joseph Abiodun Adetiloye. He became the Primate of all Nigeria, 1988–1999. Previously Bishop of Ekiti, 1970–1985. He established the Lagos Anglican Bible College (LABICO); while he was Primate the number of Dioceses in Nigeria increased from 26 to 76.
- 2000–2018: Ephraim Ademowo. Dean Emeritus of the Church of Nigeria. Archbishop of Province One comprising all the dioceses geographically located in the Southwest and Midwest, Province 1 (Supra Diocesan Board West) of the Church of Nigeria (Anglican Communion), 2000–2002; then archbishop of its replacement province, 2002–2012. In 2008, he was re-elected for another 5-year term as Archbishop of the Ecclesiastical Province of Lagos.
- 2018–2022: Humphrey Bamisebi Olumakaiye. He built several structures in what culminated into an Anglican village in Otan-Ayegbaju, Osun State.
- 2023–Present: Ifedola Senasu Gabriel Okupevi.

=== Supervising bishops ===
- 2022–2023: Dr. James Olusola Odedeji.

=== Assistant bishops ===
During Jones' episcopate, Alfred Smith (A. W. Smith) was assistant bishop for the north of the diocese, a forerunner of the Bishops of Northern Nigeria.
