= Samuel Ajani =

Anglican bishop in Nigeria (1940–2020)

Personal life
- Born: 22 April 1940
- Died: 29 January 2020 (aged 79)

Religious life
- Religion: Christianity

Samuel Ajani (22 April 1940 – 29 January 2020) was the Anglican Bishop of Egba West in Lagos Province of the Church of Nigeria.

Ajani died on 29 January 2020.

He attended CMS Grammar School, Lagos and Holloway College, London, graduating in 1969. He joined Nigerian Television Service as an Engineer, and moved to Federal Radio Corporation of Nigeria in 1978. In 1979, he was assigned to the "Abuja Project" by the Director General George Bako. He served as Director of Technical Services for FRCN. He was appointed executive director of the Ibadan National Station in 1992, a post he held until 1999.

He was the pioneer Bishop of Egba West, established in 2007; he handed over to Samuel Oludele Ogundeji on his retirement in 2010.
