= Akorede =

Nigerian given name

- Gender: Male
- Language: Yoruba

Origin
- Origin: Nigeria
- Meaning: One who brings gifts
- Region of origin: South West, Nigeria

Akorede is a Nigerian male given name and surname of Yoruba origin. It means "One who brings gifts". Notable individuals with the name includes:

- Aishah Akorede (born 17 October 1999), an Irish model and beauty pageant titleholder.
- Saheed Osupa (born 7 August 1969), Nigerian Fuji musician.
- Ebenezer Akorede Okuyelu, an Anglican bishop in Nigeria.
- McKay (rapper), (born 18 June 1997).
