= Anglican Diocese of Osun North East =

Anglican diocese in Nigeria

The Anglican Diocese of Osun North East is one of 17 dioceses within the Anglican Province of Ibadan, it is one of the 14 ecclesiastical provinces within the Church of Nigeria. The Diocese was inaugurated in 2009. The first Bishop was the Right Rev. Humphrey Bamisebi Olumakaiye, who was succeeded in 2019 by the Right Rev. Ebenezer Akorede Okuyelu.

The Bishop court is located at Bishop Olumakaiye City, Otan Ayegbaju, Osun State.

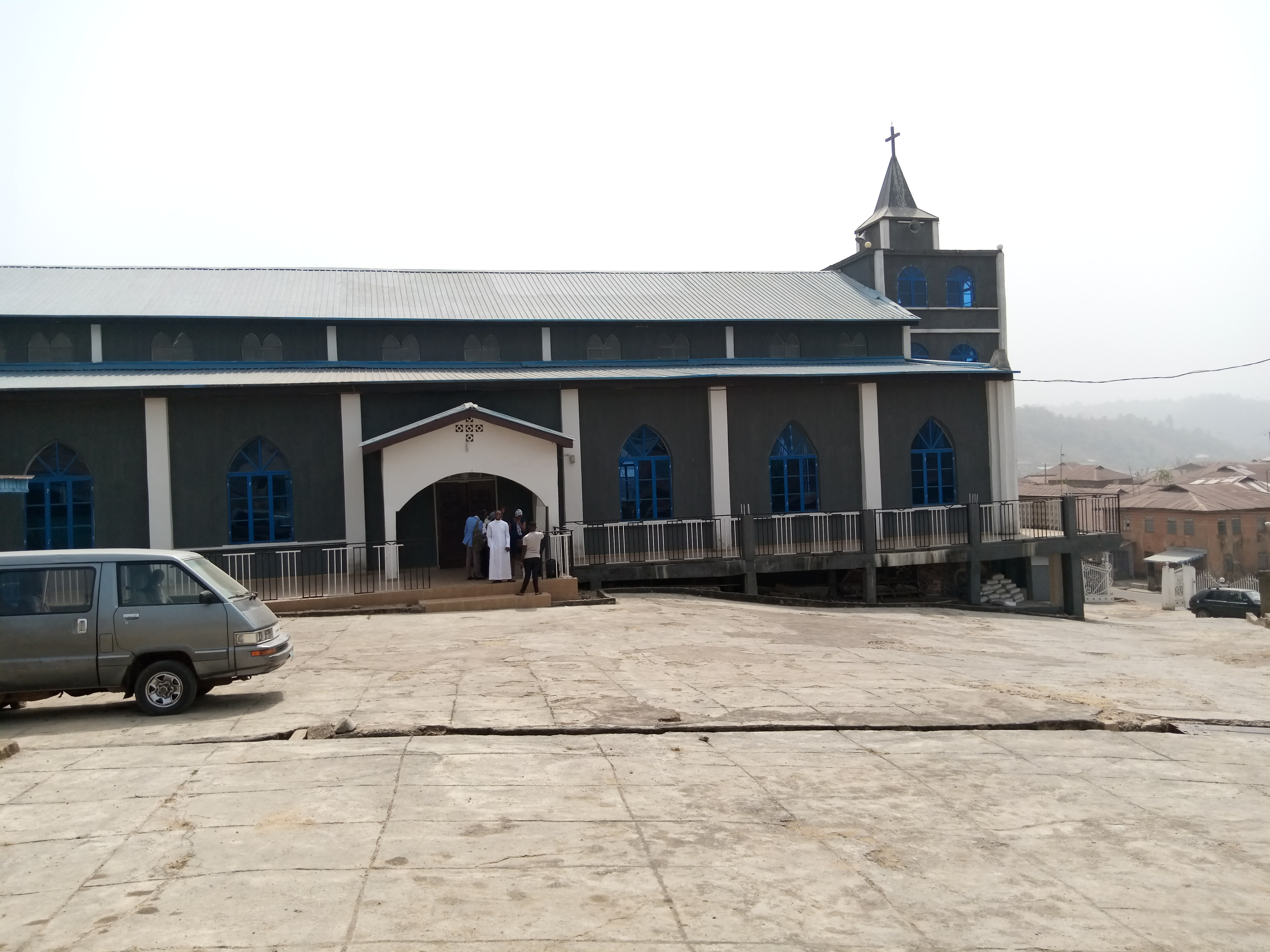
Cathedral Church of St. Philips, Otan Ayegbaju.

The Cathedral is located at Ikotun Street, Otan Ayegbaju, Osun State.
