= Ebenezer Dimieari =

Anglican bishop in Nigeria

Ebenezer Tamunoteghe Dimieari CBE was an eminent Nigerian Anglican priest in the mid twentieth century.

He was educated at St Andrew's College Oyo and St John's College, Durham; and was ordained in 1924. He was Archdeacon of the Niger from 1939 to 1946; of Bonny from 1946 to 1948; and Bishop of the Niger Delta from 1949 until 1960. He was consecrated on 29 June 1949, by Geoffrey Fisher, Archbishop of Canterbury, at St Paul's Cathedral (London, UK), to serve as assistant bishop to Cecil Patterson, Bishop on the Niger. He became first diocesan bishop of the Niger Delta on that diocese's erection, 1 January 1952.
