= Bertram Lasbrey =

Anglican bishop of Nigeria

Bertram Lasbrey was a long serving Anglican bishop in the 20th century.

He was born in 1881, educated at Bedford School and St Catharine's College, Cambridge and ordained in 1905. He held Curacies at St Andrew, Bishop Auckland and St John, Melcombe Regis. He was then Vicar of St Gabriel, Bishopwearmouth. In 1922 he became Bishop on the Niger, a post he held for 23 years. Returning to England he was an Assistant Bishop of Worcester. He died on 6 April 1976.

Religious titles
Preceded by Herbert Tugwell	Bishop on the Niger; 1922– 1945	Succeeded by Cecil Patterson
