= Oyedunni Arulogun =

Nigerian academic

Oyedunni Sola Arulogun FRSPH, FAIPH
- Citizenship: Nigerian
- Education: University of Ibadan
- Occupation: Academics
- Employer(s): University of Ibadan; Chrisland University
- Known for: Health promotion; Reproductive health; Tropical disease; Gender issues; Stroke recovery
- Title: Professor of Health Promotion and Education

Oyedunni Sola Arulogun is a Nigerian professor of health promotion and education and the second and incumbent vice-chancellor of Chrisland University, a private university in Owode, Abeokuta, Ogun State.

== Early life and education ==
After her elementary education at UMC Demonstration School, Molete, Ibadan, Arulogun proceeded to the Federal Government Girls' College, Bida, Niger State, for her West African Senior School Certificate (WASSCE) between 1976 and 1981. She gained admission to the University of Ibadan (UI) in 1984, graduating with a Bachelor of Education (B.Ed.) in Special Education. After completing her one-year mandatory national youth service, Arulogun returned to the University of Ibadan, where she earned two master's degrees: a Master of Education in Special Education (1988–1989) and a Master of Public Health (M.P.H.) (1990–1992). She later completed a Ph.D. in Health Promotion and Education at UI in 1998.

== Career ==
She first worked as a speech therapist at the University College Hospital, Ibadan (UCH) in 1989, before moving to the academics in 2002. Arulogun joined the Department of Health Promotion and Education, College of Medicine at the University of Ibadan as a lecturer in 2002, rising to the rank of professor in 2012.

Before her appointment as the vice-chancellor of Chrisland University, Arulogun, a speech pathology and audiology expert, served as the director of the centre for Entrepreneurship and Innovation at the University of Ibadan, Oyo State, Nigeria, and served on many international not-for-profit bodies.

She previously served as the dean of the Faculty of Public Health at the University of Ibadan (2014–2016). In May 2023, she became the first female orator of the University of Ibadan. Arulogun has also served and chaired various committees within and outside the university system, including acting as the chair of the Faculty of Public Health Committee on Timely Completion of MPH Courses and Chairperson of the Oyo State Advisory Committee on Neglected Tropical Diseases (OYSACON) in 2016.

She assumed office as the vice-chancellor of Chrisland University on 1 November 2024, succeeding Prof. Chinedum Babalola (November 2017-November 2024).

== Membership ==
Arulogun is a fellow of the Royal Society for Public Health, the African Institute of Public Health and the Institute of Classical Entrepreneurship, Nigeria.

== Publications ==
Arulogun's works have been published on local and international platforms, including the National Library of Medicine. Some of the publications she co-authored include:

- Oyedunni S. Arulogun, Isaac F. Adewole, Lynda Olayinka-Alli, and A. Olubukola Adesina (2007). "Community Gatekeepers' Awareness and Perception of Prevention of Mother-to-Child Transmission of HIV Services in Ibadan, Nigeria". African Journal of Reproductive Health, 11(1): 67–75.
- Kavanaugh, Megan L.; Moore, Ann M.; Akinyemi, Odunayo; Adewole, Isaac; Dzekedzeke, Kumbutso; Awolude, Olutosin; Arulogun, Oyedunni (23 November 2012). "Community attitudes towards childbearing and abortion among HIV-positive women in Nigeria and Zambia".
