= Ephraim Ademowo =

Nigerian Anglican bishop (born 1948)

The Most Reverend Ephraim Ademowo
- Retired Bishop of Lagos; Dean emeritus, Church of Nigeria
- Diocese: Diocese of Lagos
- In office: 2000–2018
- Predecessor: J. Abiodun Adetiloye
- Successor: Humphrey Bamisebi Olumakaiye
- Other posts: Bishop of Ilesa (1989–2000); Archbishop of Province 1/Archbishop of Lagos (2000–2012; title changed 2002); Dean, Church of Nigeria (2010–2012); Bishop of Lagos (2000–2018)

Orders
- Ordination: 1973
- Consecration: 1989 by J. Abiodun Adetiloye

Personal details
- Born: Ephraim Adebola Ademowo; 29 July 1948 (age 77)

Most Rev. (Dr) Ephraim Adebola Ademowo (born 29 July 1948) is a retired Nigerian Anglican Archbishop. He was the erstwhile Diocesan Bishop of Ilesa (1989–2000), Bishop of Lagos (2000–2018), Dean of the Church of Nigeria (2010–2012), Provincial Archbishop of Lagos (2002–2012) and Archbishop of Province 1 (2000–2002).

Son of a veteran headmaster and educationist, Ademowo attended Immanuel College of Theology, Ibadan in 1969, was made a deacon in 1972 and ordained priest in 1973. He graduated as Bachelor of Arts (BA), majoring in Theology at the University of Ibadan in 1977, and earned his master's degree at the Obafemi Awolowo University (OAU), Ile-Ife and his Doctor of Philosophy (PhD) degree at the same university.

He was elected Bishop of Ilesa in 1989, and translated to the Diocese of Lagos in 2000 as both Bishop of Lagos and Archbishop of Province 1, becoming archbishop of Lagos province (2002–2013) when the current division was adopted.

The Church of Nigeria appointed Ademowo the Dean of the Church in a press statement released at 5 August 2010. He succeeded Maxwell Anikwenwa, who retired as Bishop of Awka, Archbishop of the Niger and Dean of the Church on 22 November 2010. He relinquished the post in 2012.

Ademowo was invested as Honorary Fellow of the Nigerian Academy of Letters (FNAL) in 2006 and conferred in 2008 with the national honour of "Officer of the Order of the Niger (OON)" by Umaru Musa Yar'Adua, President of Nigeria, on behalf of the government and people of Nigeria.

He is married to Oluranti I. Ademowo and they have children.

He retired as Bishop of Lagos in August 2018 and was replaced by Humphrey Olumakaiye.
