= Christopher Kolade =

Nigerian diplomat and academic (1932–2025)

Christopher Kolade, CON (28 December 1932 – 8 October 2025) was a Nigerian diplomat and academic.

== Early life and education ==
Kolade was born in Erin – Oke, Colony and Protectorate of Nigeria on 28 December 1932. He was the son of an Anglican missionary. He completed his secondary-school education at Government College, Ibadan after which he studied at Fourah Bay College, Freetown, Sierra Leone.

== Career ==
Kolade worked as a broadcaster and was Director General of the Nigerian Broadcasting Corporation. He was Chief Executive and Chairman of Cadbury Nigeria Plc and formerly the Nigerian High Commissioner to the United Kingdom. He was a colonial era Education Officer in Nigeria. He taught Corporate Governance and Human Resources Management at Lagos Business School (LBS), and Leadership & Conflict Management at School of Media & Communication (SMC). LBS and SMC are both schools of Pan-Atlantic University, Lagos. Formerly a member of the university's Governing Council, Kolade as of 2012 was the Pro-Chancellor and Chairman of the Governing Council of Pan-Atlantic University. He was the Chancellor of McPherson University, Ogun, Nigeria.

Kolade promoted business integrity in Nigeria through his chairmanship of organisations such as Integrity Organisation Ltd GTE and The Convention on Business Integrity Ltd GTE.

== Personal life and death ==
He married Nancy Omolabi Kolade in 1957.

He died on 8 October 2025, at the age of 92.
