= Akinpelu Johnson =

Anglican bishop of Nigeria

Babatunde Colenso Akinpelu Johnson (born 1965) is an Anglican bishop in Nigeria: he has been Bishop of Lagos Mainland since 2016.

Johnson was educated at Immanuel College of Theology, Ibadan, King's College London and the University of Kent. He was ordained in 1990 and served his title at All Saint's, Yaba, after which he was Vicar of St. John, Aroloya. He became Archdeacon of Apapa and then Provost of the diocese.
