= Oreoluwa Osoba (Oga Duke) =

- Born: Lagos, Nigeria
- Citizenship: Ogun State, Nigeria
- Known for: Pet Influencer

Oreoluwa Osoba, known as Oga Duke, is a Nigerian pet influencer and content creator.

== Early life and education ==
Osoba was born in Lagos, Nigeria, and is originally from Ogun State, Nigeria. He is a first-class graduate of Computer Science and the youngest child in his family. As of 2025, Osoba was 29 years old.

== Career ==
He adopted the dog in 2023 from a family in South Africa as a way of grieving the death of his uncle, who was like a father to him. The name Oga Duke comes from his dog, Duke, a miniature Schnauzer, with Osoba referring to himself as the “oga.” Osoba adopted Duke at three months old, and after posting a video of the dog online, it went viral. He has grown his platform to more than million followers.

Osoba's content with the dog is framed around conversations between him and his dog, which he says recreates the discipline he experienced from his mother during his childhood. He employs an authentic approach, and his most popular video has been viewed more than five million times. He has been featured by the BBC, the Los Angeles Times, and other global media outlets.

He believes his content can change how Nigerians treat dogs, as his mother and friends did not initially understand why a dog should be treated as a member of the family. Osoba has also noted that Lagos lacks pet-friendly parks and other pet-friendly places, making it difficult to take Duke out.
