= Anglican Diocese of Lokoja =

Anglican diocese in Nigeria

Coordinates: 07°48′07″N 06°44′39″E

The Anglican Diocese of Lokoja is one of eleven within the Anglican Province of Lokoja, itself one of 14 ecclesiastical provinces within the Church of Nigeria. The current bishop is the Right Rev. Emmanuel Egbunu, the Archbishop Emeritus of Lokoja.

The diocese was inaugurated on 18 October 1994, with George Bako as the pioneer Bishop.
