= Samuel Oke =

Anglican bishop in Nigeria

Samuel Oke is an Anglican bishop in Nigeria: he was the pioneer Bishop of Ekiti West from 2005 until his retirement in 2018.
