= George Bako =

Anglican bishop in Nigeria

George Bako was the Anglican Bishop of Lokoja in Lokoja Province of the Church of Nigeria.

He attended CMS Grammar School, Lagos.

Bako was Director-General of the Federal Radio Corporation of Nigeria, and Third President of the Commonwealth Broadcasting Association, from June 1982 to November 1984.

He was consecrated as the pioneer Bishop of Lokoja in 1994. The second bishop, Emmanuel Egbunu, was enthroned in 2004.

He is the subject of the book George Bako Bishop of Lokoja: The Controversial Fool for Christ by Chukwurah Ezebube.
