= Peter Rotimi Oludipe =

Anglican Bishop of Nigeria

- Bishop of the Church of Nigeria
- Diocese: Anglican Diocese of Ijebu
- In office: 2020–present
- Predecessor: Ezekiel Awosoga

Orders
- Ordination: 1992
- Consecration: 2020

Personal details
- Born: Iwaya, Ijebu, Ogun State, Nigeria

Peter Rotimi Oludipe is a Nigerian church leader of the Anglican Communion. He serves as the current and fifth Bishop of the Anglican Diocese of Ijebu since 2020.

Born in Iwaya, Ijebu, Ogun State, Oludipe was educated at St. Andrew's Primary School, Isonyin Grammar School, and Ogun State School of Basic Studies, Ijebu Ode. He later went it the University of Ibadan and the Immanuel College of Theology, Ibadan. Olidipe was ordained a deacon in 1991 and an Anglican priest the next year. He served at Yemetu and Oke Bola, both in Oyo State. In 1998, he became a canon and an archdeacon in 1999. In 2010, he was appointed Provost of the Cathedral Church of Our Saviour in Ijasi, Ijebu-Ode in 2010 which followed his consecration on 21 September 2020, as the Bishop of Ijebu.

== Early life and education ==
Oludipe was born in Iwaya Ijebu in Ogun State, Nigeria, where he started his primary education in St. Andrew’s Primary School in Imuwen, and Isonyin Grammar School, Isonyin from 1976 to 1981. He later graduated as a secondary school student at Ogun State School of Basic Studies in 1983. He furthered to Immanuel College of Theology in Ibadan, Oyo State from 1986 to 1989 and the University of Ibadan where he had his B.A. RS in religious studies, master’s and PhD in Guidance and Counselling and Counselling Psychology respectively.

== Career ==
After his education, he started working at the Anglican Diocese of Ibadan until his ordination as deacon in 1991. The ordination was done by G.I.O. Olajide and a priest on 5 July, 1992. He married Bimbola Oludipe.
