= African Centre for Development and Strategic Studies =

Nigeria-based research institute

African Centre for Development and Strategic Studies is a multidisciplinary research and developmental think tank founded in 1991 and located in Ijebu-Ode, Ogun State, Nigeria. The centre is dedicated to policy research and strategic studies of Africa. Principal area of focus includes the role of post-apartheid South Africa, exiting external debts, mastering African conflicts and sustaining democracy. ACDESS is a private think-tank, though it does receive funding and support for specific projects and seminars from international organisations and governments. ACDESS has had fellows leading research in the centre and published books and reports from the work of the centre.

== Executive Director ==
Professor Adebayo Adedeji. CFR--- (CeeVee)
