= Anglican Diocese of Lagos Mainland =

Anglican diocese in Nigeria

The Anglican Diocese of Lagos Mainland is one of 13 within the Anglican Province of Lagos, itself one of 14 ecclesiastical provinces within the Church of Nigeria. The bishop emeritus is Adebayo Dada Akinde and the current bishop is the Right Rev. Akinpelu Johnson; Johnson was consecrated a bishop on 24 July 2016 at Archbishop Vinning Memorial Church Cathedral, Ikeja.
