= Anglican Diocese of Badagry =

Anglican diocese in Nigeria

The Anglican Diocese of Badagry is one of 13 dioceses within the Anglican Province of Lagos, itself one of 14 ecclesiastical provinces within the Church of Nigeria. The bishop since 2005 is the Right Rev. Joseph Adeyemi.
