= Arepo, Nigeria =

Coordinates: 6°41′49″N 3°25′11″E

Arepo is a populated place located in Ogun State, Nigeria.

It is a suburb of Lagos, Nigeria and it is often referred to as New Lagos while some others have referred to it as Magodo 3. It comprises mainly residential properties with neighborhood commercial centers including shopping centres, a central market, and places of worship for both the Christian and Muslim faiths.

Arepo came into the consciousness of real estate property developers when the administration of Chief Olusegun Osoba as the Executive Governor of Ogun state set up the Journalist Estate Phase 1 for journalists across Nigeria and this has gone on to grow to include other estates including VOERA Estate (Orange Estate), Journalist Estate Phase 2, PraiseHill Estate, Ya-Wahab Estate, Alfirdaus Estate and many others.
