= Chrisland University =

Private university in Nigeria

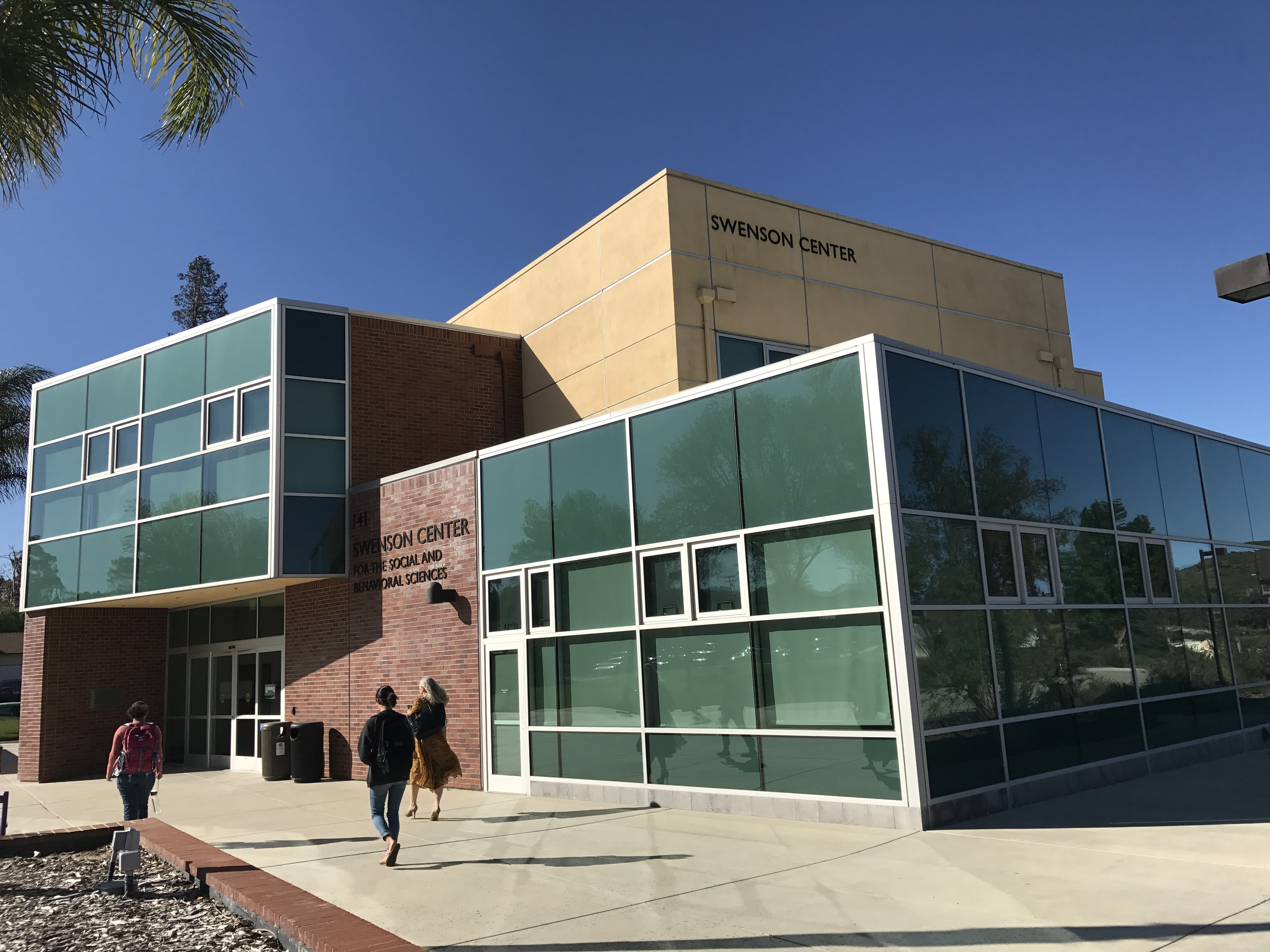
- Other name: CLU
- Motto: Intellectual Radiance
- Type: Private
- Established: 2015
- Chancellor: W. A. Awosika
- Vice-Chancellor: Prof. Oyedunni Arulogun
- Location: Abeokuta, Ogun State, Nigeria; 7.1397°N 3.4032°E
- Campus: Private university, urban
- Website: www.chrislanduniversity.edu.ng/Site/
- Location within Nigeria

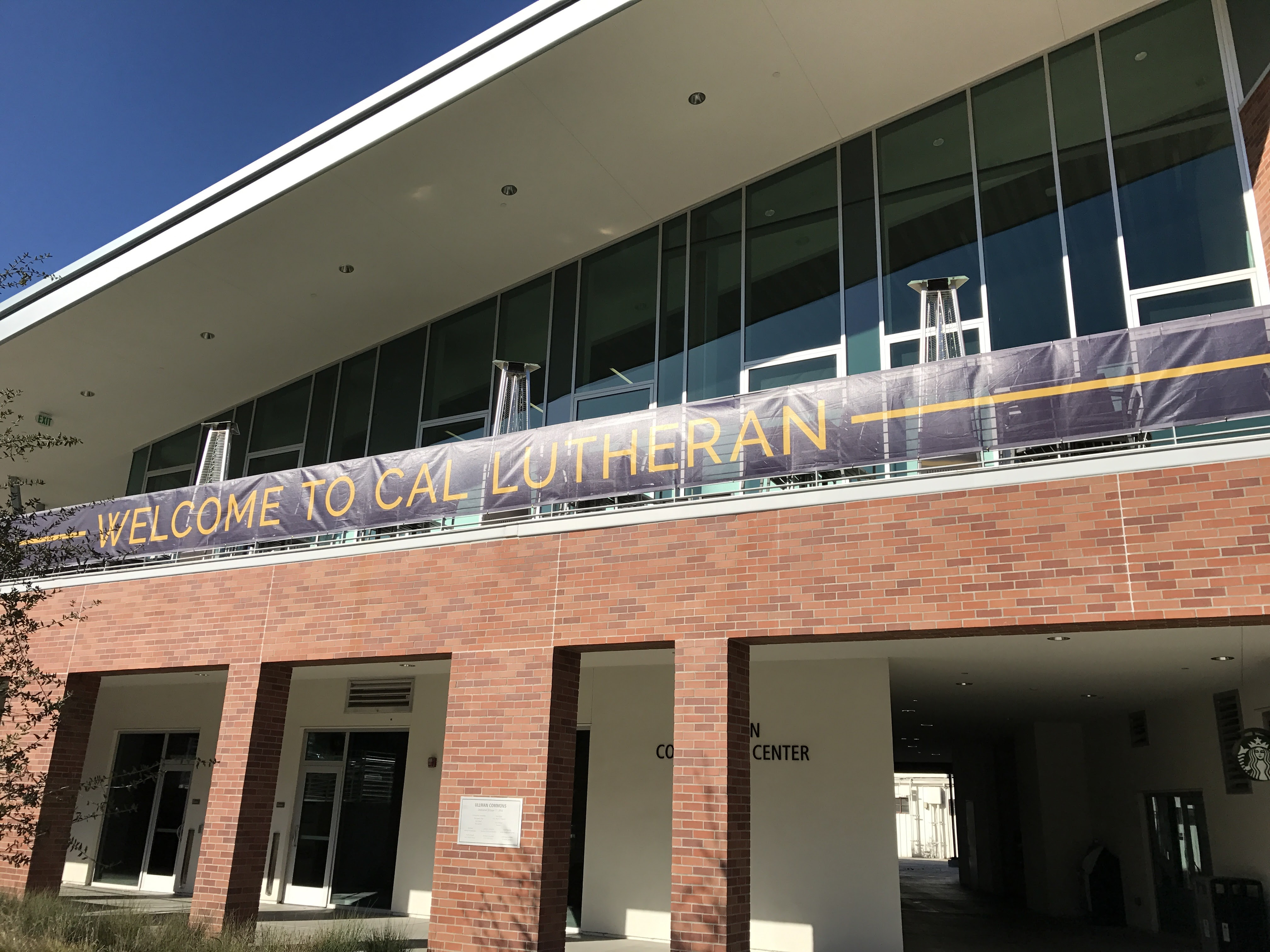
CLU cafeteria

Chrisland University is located in Abeokuta, Ogun State, Nigeria. It was founded in 2015 and is accredited by the National Universities Commission.

== History ==
On September 17, 2015, the Federal Republic of Nigeria's National Universities Commission granted the institution a full operational license to function as a private institution in Nigeria beginning in 2019.

Prof. Chinedum Peace Babalola was appointed as the first vice-chancellor of the institution in November 2017.

On 1 November 2024, the Governing Council of Chrisland University appointed Prof. Oyedunni Arulogun as the second substantive vice-chancellor. She became the second female vice chancellor of the university.
