= Denis Hall (bishop) =

British Anglican colonial bishop

Denis Bartlett Hall (9 April 1899 – 5 April 1983) was a British Anglican colonial bishop in the mid-twentieth century.

He was educated at Bristol Grammar School and served in the RNVR from 1917 to 1919. He graduated from the University of Bristol in 1923, after which he studied for ordination at Ridley Hall, Cambridge. He was made a deacon in 1924 and ordained priest at Michaelmas 1925 (4 October), by Hensley Henson, Bishop of Durham, at St Andrew's Bishop Auckland. After a curacy at St Gabriel, Sunderland he was Chaplain of the school ship, HMS Conway. He was Vicar of Bishopston, Bristol from 1930 to 1947 and Assistant Bishop on the Niger from 1947 to 1957: he was consecrated a bishop on 25 April 1947, by Geoffrey Fisher, Archbishop of Canterbury, at Westminster Abbey. He returned to Britain as Vicar of Thornton Heath from 1957 to 1961 and an Assistant Bishop of Canterbury from 1960 to 1961; and Rector of Tormarton from 1961 to 1966 (where his brother E.M. Hall was already area dean).
