= Adebayo Akinde =

Anglican bishop of Nigeria

The Most Reverend Adebayo Akinde
- Archbishop of Lagos Province (retired)
- Diocese: Diocese of Lagos Mainland
- In office: 2006–2016
- Predecessor: (newly created)
- Successor: (as Bishop of Lagos Mainland)

Orders
- Consecration: 28 June 2006

Personal details
- Born: Adebayo Dada Akinde; 25 August 1946 (age 80) Kaduna, Nigeria
- Denomination: Anglican
- Spouse: Dr. Bassey Akinde (d. 2025)
- Children: Three sons
- Occupation: Academic, Bishop
- Education: Obafemi Awolowo University; University College London; University of Sussex

Most Rev. (Prof) Adebayo Akinde is an academic and bishop in Nigeria.

He was born in Kaduna on 25 August 1946. He was educated at Obafemi Awolowo University; University College, London; and the University of Sussex. He was on the staff of Obafemi Awolowo University from 1973 to 2002, specializing in electronic engineering and computing. Akinde was ordained deacon in 1979 and priest in 1981. In 1992, he became a Canon and the following year an Archdeacon. He was Provost of the Cathedral of St. Peter, Abeokuta from 2000 until 2006. He was Bishop of Lagos Mainland and Archbishop of Lagos, retiring in 2016.

He became Archbishop of Lagos Province on 19 January 2013.

He was elected pioneer Bishop of Lagos Mainland during the Episcopal Synod on 28 June 2006, at All Saints Church, Wuse, Abuja.
