= Humphrey Bamisebi Olumakaiye =

Anglican bishop in Nigeria (1969–2022)

Humphrey Bamisebi Olumakaiye (28 January 1969 – 30 October 2022) was a bishop of the Church of Nigeria and Archbishop of the Anglican Province of Lagos, Nigeria. Until his death, he was the Bishop of Lagos, and Archbishop of the Ecclesiastical Province of Lagos (Anglican Communion), Church of Nigeria having been Bishop of Osun North East Diocese, Otan Ayegbaj until 2018, and presented as the Archbishop of Lagos Ecclesiastical Province on 7 November 2021, at the Cathedral Church of Advent, Life Camp, Abuja.

== Early life ==
Humphrey Bamisebi Olumakaiye was born on 28 January 1969 at Okene, Nigeria, into the family of the Venerable and Mrs. T.A. Olumakaiye. He was a native of Idanre in Ondo State.

== Education ==
Olumakaiye started his Education at St. Michael's primary school, Esie in 1975 from where he proceeded to Government Secondary School, Omu-Aran, Kwara State in 1982. He left Omu-Aran in 1983 and concluded his Secondary education at Cherubim Seraphim Secondary School, Ilorin in 1986.

Between 1991 and 1993, he obtained his first degree in Religious Studies from the University of Ibadan, Master's Degree in Religious Studies in 2001 and doctorate degree in Church History and Doctrine from the same university. Following his training and graduation from Immanuel College of Theology, Ibadan, he was made a deacon in June 1993 and ordained a priest in December same year by E.A. Ademowo, Bishop of Ilesha Diocese.

== Ministry ==
Olumakaiye started his ministry at Christ the Saviour Anglican Church, Cappa, Ilesa in June 1993. While at Cappa, he was preferred a Statutory Canon in November 1999 to occupy Archbishop Adetiloye's stall, and Bishop Ademowo preferred him an Archdeacon of Imo Archdeaconry and Vicar of St. James's Church, Imo Ilesa 2000.

As the Vicar of St. Matthew's Church and Archdeacon of Ijebu-Jesa, he lifted the status of St. Matthew's church to become a cathedral in January 2009, and he became the first Dean of Cathedral St. Matthew Ijebu-Jesa, Ijesa North Missionary Diocese.

Olumakaiye was elected Bishop on May 22, 2009 at the age of 40, he was consecrated Bishop on Sunday, July 12, 2009 in Yenagoa, Bayelsa state while he was enthroned on Thursday, July 16, 2009 at Cathedral church of St. Philip's, Otan Ayegbaju as the first Bishop of Anglican Diocese of Osun North East.

Within two years of his Episcopacy in the Diocese, he built a multi-million naira Bishop's court, a chapel and a library and Resource Centre. The Diocese Headquarters also has a hall, Bishop's office Complex school and many other structures. He also built a prayer mountain and a prayer prayer town in the Diocese. A quarter of Otan Ayegbaju was named after him by the Owa of Otan Ayegbaju, Oba Lukman Adesola Ojo Fadipe (Owa Olatanka III).

Olumakaiye was translated into the See of Lagos on Tuesday, February 6, 2018 and enthroned as the 8th Bishop of Lagos on Monday, July 30, 2018 at the Cathedral Church of Christ, Marina, Lagos. He acquired 1500 plots of land for the Diocese and named it Centenary City where he was building low income Housing Estate, Gethsemane garden, Hospital, Convention ground, women & youth empowerment center, Amusement park and lots more.

Olumakaiye has served as the Coordinator, prayer convocation for Ibadan province: the secretary of supra west, church of Nigeria (comprising 63 Dioceses): the secretary of the proprietors desk of Ajayi Crowther University, Oyo. He was member of pension and gratuity board, supra west church of Nigeria and a member of governing council, Ajayi Crowther University, Oyo.

Olumakaiye was the first Nigerian priest to preach at Melbourne church, London. For four years, he was an annual guest lecturer at St. Luke's Central, Birmingham. UK, (2011-2015). In 2003, he attended the world mission conference in Derbyshire and University of Birmingham.

Bishop Olumakaiye published two books:

- Anglican women: Position, privileges and prospects of women in the church
- Inculturation and decolonization of oral and liturgical theology of the Anglican Communion, Nigeria.

== Personal life and death ==
Olumakaiye was married to Motunrayo Funke, a professor and former head of the department of nutrition and consumer sciences, faculty of agriculture Obafemi Awolowo University (O.A.U.), Ile -Ife, Osun state. The union is blessed with biological and spiritual children.

Olumakaiye died following a short illness in the evening of Sunday 30 October 2022, at the age of 53.
