= Samuel Nkemena =

Samuel Nkemena, OBE was an Anglican bishop in the 20th century.

Nkemena was educated at St Paul's College, Awka and ordained in 1931. He was a parish priest from then until his appointment as Archdeacon of Aba in 1949. In 1955 he became Archdeacon of Owerri; and also that year an Assistant Bishop to the Bishop on the Niger. He retired in 1961.
