= Samuel Oludele Ogundeji =

Anglican bishop in Nigeria

Samuel Oludele Ogundeji is an Anglican bishop in Nigeria: he is the current Bishop of Egba West.

He became Bishop of Egba West in 2010 on the retirement of Samuel Ajani.
