= Babatunde Ogunbanwo =

Anglican bishop of Nigeria

Babatunde Ogunbanwo is an Anglican bishop in Nigeria: he is the current Bishop of Ijebu-South West.

Ogunbanwo was educated at the University of Ibadan and Immanuel College of Theology, Ibadan.

He was elected as Bishop of Bishop of Ijebu-South West on 29 October 2009 at the Episcopal synod of the Church of Nigeria Anglican Communion held at the Basilica of Grace Apo in Gudu district of the Anglican Diocese of Abuja. He had previously been Dean of the Cathedral of St. Paul in Shagamu.
