= Emmanuel Egbunu =

Anglican bishop in Nigeria

Emmanuel Egbunu is the Diocesan Bishop of Lokoja; and the Archbishop Emeritus of the Anglican Province of Lokoja, one of 14 within the Church of Nigeria.

He was the second Bishop of Lokoja, enthroned in 2004.

Egbunu was born on 4 September 1960 in Lokoja.
