= Lukmon Atobatele =

Nigerian politician

Lukmon Atobatele is a Nigerian politician. He currently represents the Abeokuta South I constituency in the Ogun State House of Assembly, where he serves as the Deputy Minority Leader.

== Early life and education ==
Atobatele is a native of Igbeyin Town Ogun State and the son of the Prime Minister of Egba Land, Alh. Sikirulai Olatunde Atobatele. He obtained his Grade 2 primary school leaving certificate from Ogba Primary School, Ogba-ljaye, lkeja, Lagos State in 1988. He received his SSCE and GCE in 1994 from Abeokula Grammar School, ldi-Aba, Abeokuta, Ogun State. He obtained his first degree in Applied Physics from Ladoke Akintola University in 2002.
