= Michael Fape =

Anglican bishop in Nigeria

Michael Fape is an Anglican archbishop in Nigeria: he is the current Bishop of Remo and Archbishop of the Ecclesiastical Province of Lagos.

Fape was educated at the University of Ibadan and ordained in 1984. He was made a Canon in Ibadan Diocese in 1995 and an Archdeacon in 1997. He became a bishop in 2003; and an archbishop in 2016. He was enthroned as Bishop of Remo in 2004.
