= Joseph Adeyemi =

Anglican bishop in Nigeria (born 1957)

- Born: February 14, 1957 (age 69); Lagos
- Education: Lagos State University = Badagry college
- Occupation: Bishop

Babatunde Joseph Adeyemi is an Anglican bishop in Nigeria, he is the current Bishop of Badagry.

Adeyemi was born on 14 January 1957 in Ojo, Lagos State. He was educated at Government Teachers’ Training College, Badagry; Immanuel College of Theology, Ibadan; and Lagos State University. After three years as a teacher, he was ordained deacon in 1984 and priest in 1986. After a curacy at Ebute Metta he held incumbencies at Awodi-Ora, Idumu and Festac Town. He became a Canon in 1999 and Archdeacon of Festac in 2000.

He was consecrated as the pioneer Bishop of Badagry on 13 March 2005. He has been the patron of the Lagos Scripture Union since 2010.
