= Yewa River =

River in Nigeria and Benin

Yewa River Odò Yéwa
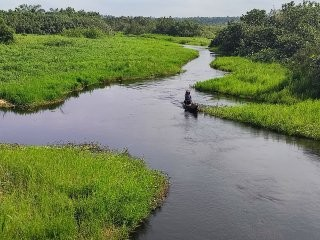

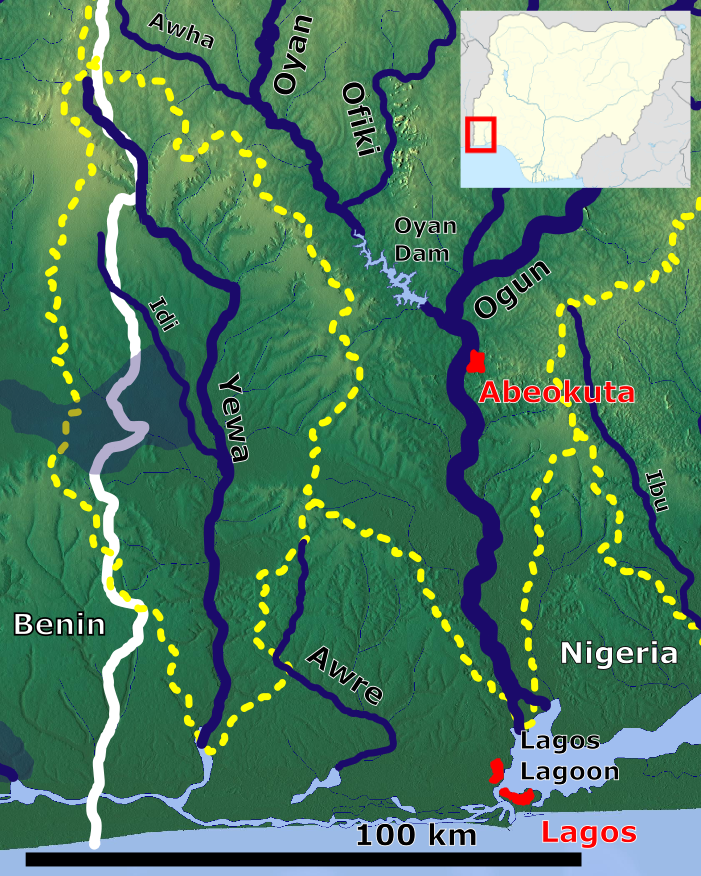

Location
- Country: Nigeria, Benin
- Cities: Atan, Porto Novo, Ilaro, Ado-Odo, Apamu, Igunnu Akabo, Badagry

Physical characteristics
- Mouth: Atlantic Ocean
  - location: Yewa Lagoon, Nigeria

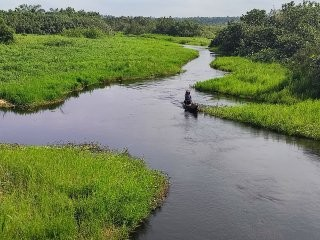
Pathways of Yewa River in Ogun State

The Yewa River (Yoruba: Odò Yéwa), is a trans-national river between Nigeria and the Republic of Benin, running south through the interior of southwest Nigeria and then parallel to the coastline along the Bight of Benin. At one point, it crosses the border between the two countries. Other variants of the name are Yeoua, and, with accents, Yéoua and Yéwa. Its elevation is sea level. The Yewa's major tributaries are the Atan and Ilaro rivers. The Yewa empties into Badagry Creek which in turn empties into the Lagos Harbor.

The river is in a West African tropical climate zone and is an important source of fishing for local inhabitants. An important aspect of the local fishing is the blue crab (Callinectes amnicola). In addition to fishing, the river is an important factor in logging and sand mining operations. Some of the plants that inhabit the river and its banks are sedges (such as Cyperus articulatus, Cyperus papyrus, and Paspalum vaginatum) and palms (such as Pandanus candelabrum, Raphia hookeri, and Phoenix reclinata).

== Pollution ==
According to research, Yewa rivers alongside other rivers are known to discharge large amounts of water from inland and coastal cities which is directed to Lagos lagoon. The activities that cause this pollution entail industrial, domestic and agricultural activities. These contain organic and inorganic pollutants which affect the health risks of water bodies and people who consume them.
