= McPherson University =

Private university in Abeokuta, Nigeria

- Former name: LIFE University
- Motto: To build a People of Excellence and Integrity for Service
- Type: Private
- Established: 2012
- Chancellor: Dr. Mutiu Sunmonu
- Vice-Chancellor: Prof. Francis Igbasan
- Students: About 5,000
- Location: Seriki-Sotayo, Ogun State, Nigeria
- Campus: 302.210 acres (122.300 ha); Urban
- Newspaper: McU Echo
- Nickname: McU
- Website: Official website

Established in 2012, McPherson University (McU) is named after the late Aimee Semple McPherson – the founder of Foursquare Gospel Church.

== Courses ==
As a licensed Institution, McU runs programs that award doctoral and masters megrees, bachelor of science and of arts from three Colleges. McU is an affiliate institution of Joint Universities Preliminary Examinations Board (JUPEB).

== Library ==
McPherson University Library was established alongside its parent institution, McPherson University. The University Librarian (UL) as the academic and administrative head of the Library has full responsibility for its day-to-day running.
