= Anglican Diocese of Awori =

Anglican diocese in Nigeria

The Anglican Diocese of Awori is one of 13 dioceses within the Anglican Province of Lagos, itself one of 14 ecclesiastical provinces within the Church of Nigeria. The current bishop is Johnson Akin Atere.
