= Adebayo Adedeji =

Nigerian economist and academic

Prof. Adebayo Adedeji CFR
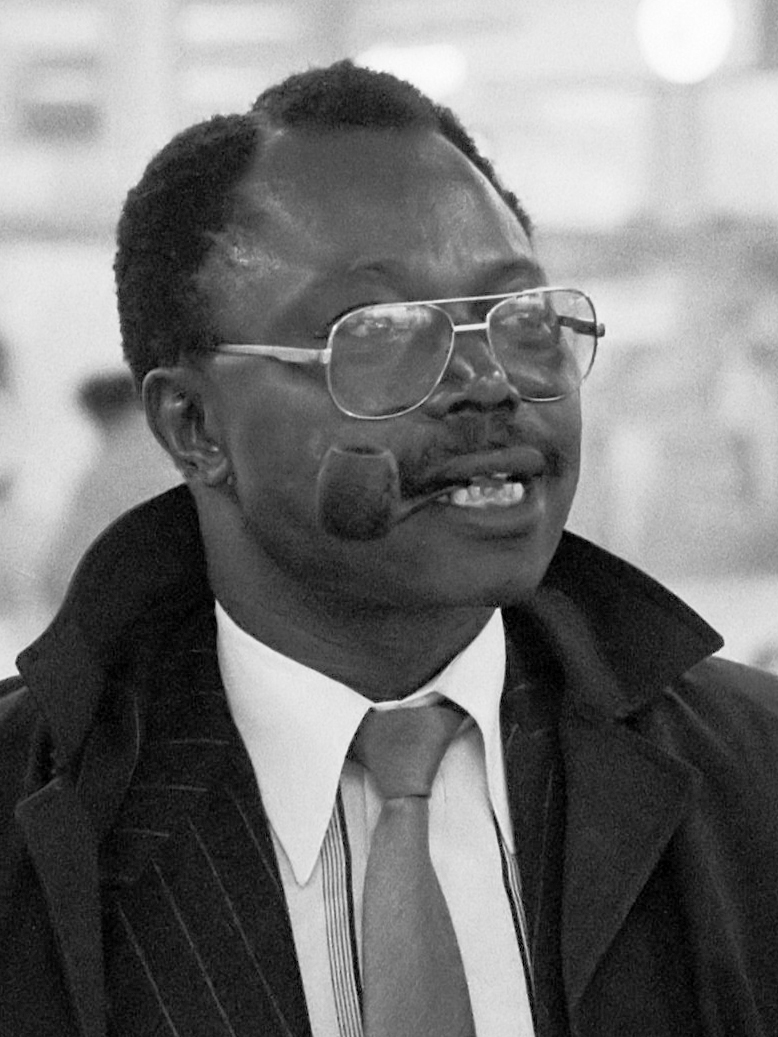
- Adedeji in 1986
- Born: 21 December 1930; Ijebu-Ode, Nigeria
- Died: 25 April 2018 (aged 87); Lagos, Nigeria
- Education: University of London, Harvard University
- Occupations: Economist; Academic
- Awards: HLF LIFE-TIME ACHIEVEMENT AWARD for Nigeria’sMost Outstanding International Economic Icon

Adebayo Adedeji (21 December 1930 – 25 April 2018) was a Nigerian economist and academic. A professor at the age of 36 years, he was Nigeria's Federal Commissioner for Economic Development & Reconstruction from 1971 to 1975. He was responsible for the economic development and reconstruction of post-civil war Nigeria. In June 1975, he was appointed Executive Secretary of the United Nations Economic Commission for Africa and remained in this position until July 1991. Adedeji wrote the Lagos Plan of Action of 1980 that was adopted by the UN and OAU. On his return to Nigeria, he founded the African Centre for Development and Strategic Studies (ACDESS), a non-governmental independent continental non-profit, think-tank dedicated to multi-disciplinary and strategic studies on and for Africa. He received the national honor of Commander of the Federal Republic.

In December 2010, after turning 80, he retired from public life and spent the last years of his life quietly in his home town of Ijebu-Ode, Ogun State, Nigeria.

Adedeji was elected a Fellow of the African Academy of Sciences in 1991.

== Biography ==
Adebayo Adedeji was born on 21 December 1930 in Ijebu Ode, Nigeria.

Adedeji died in the evening on 25 April 2018 in Lagos after suffering from a long illness. UNECA held a memorial symposium in his honor on 7 July in Lagos.
