= Timothy Olufosoye =

Anglican bishop in Nigeria

The Most Reverend Timothy O. Olufosoye
- Primate of all Nigeria
- Church: Church of Nigeria
- See: Abuja
- In office: February 1979 – December 1986
- Previous post: Bishop of Ibadan

Orders
- Ordination: 21 December 1947
- Consecration: 10 October 1965

Personal details
- Born: Nigeria
- Died: October 30, 1992

Timothy Omotayo Olufosoye (born c. 1907/1912 – 30 October 1992) was the first Primate of the Church of Nigeria. He was married and had several children.

The grandson of a tribal chief, his father was the first Christian of his region. His birthdate wasn't recorded and he is believed to have been born between 1907 and 1912. Olufosoye was trained as a catechist and schoolteacher at St. Andrew's College, Oyo, from 1940 to 1941. He had his religious studies at Melville Hall, in Oyo, from 1945 to 1946, being ordained a deacon on December 15, 1946 and a priest at Christ Church Cathedral, Lagos, on December 21, 1947.

He first served as a priest in Lagos and Ondo, from 1952 to 1956, being canon residentiary, from 1955 to 1959, and the first provost of the Cathedral of Ondo, from 1959 to 1965. He was consecrated the first African bishop of the Diocese of Gambia and the Rio Pongas on October 10, 1965. He became bishop of the diocese of Ibadan, in Nigeria, in 1971. With the creation of the Church of Nigeria as an autonomous province within the Anglican Communion, he was elected the first Archbishop, on 24 February 1979, a position he held until his retirement in December 1986. During his tenure the number of dioceses of his province increased from 16 to 27.

Anglican Communion titles
Preceded by new title	Primate of the Anglican Church of Nigeria; 1979–1986	Succeeded by J. Abiodun Adetiloye
