= Ebenezer Akorede Okuyelu =

Anglican bishop in Nigeria

Ebenezer Akorede Okuyelu was an Anglican bishop in Nigeria: he was the Bishop of Osun North East.

He was consecrated Bishop of Osun North East in April 2019 at St David's Anglican Cathedral Church, Ijomu, Akure, by the Primate of All Nigeria, Nicholas Okoh.

In 2022, PIJAlance Magazine, a foremost Nigeria's Community-driven Investigative Journalism organisation, published that Bishop Okuyelu engaged in carnal knowledge with a prostitute. Subsequently, the organisation reported that the bishop was suspended; however, PIJAlance's URL was subjected to a shadow ban and was subsequently blocked by Meta. It took a year later before the challenge was resolved as a result of the issue; the organisation reported.
