= Anglican Diocese of Ijebu-North =

Anglican diocese in Nigeria

The Anglican Diocese of IIjebu-North is one of 13 dioceses within the Anglican Province of Lagos, itself one of 14 ecclesiastical provinces within the Church of Nigeria. The current bishop is the Right Rev. Godwin Odubena.
