= Anglican Diocese on the Niger =

Oldest diocese of the Church of Nigeria

The Anglican Diocese on the Niger is the mother diocese (oldest diocese) of the Church of Nigeria (Anglican Communion). It is one of 10 Anglican dioceses in the Anglican Province of the Niger within the Church of Nigeria. The diocese was created in 1864 as the 'Diocese of West African Territories Beyond the British Dominions' or 'Diocese of the Niger' with Bishop Samuel Ajayi Crowther as the bishop. At Crowther's death in 1891, the diocese was merged with the Lagos and Yoruba sections of the Nigerian mission which had been under the Diocese of Sierra Leone and renamed 'the Diocese of Western Equatorial Africa' with Bishop John Sidney Hill as bishop. He was succeeded by Bishop Herbert Tugwell. In 1920 the Diocese of Equatorial West Africa was divided into two: an eastern part (the continuing diocese, now named the Diocese on the Niger) and a western part (a new diocese, named the Diocese of Lagos). A part of the Diocese on the Niger was subsequently carved out in 1946 to create the Niger Delta Diocese.

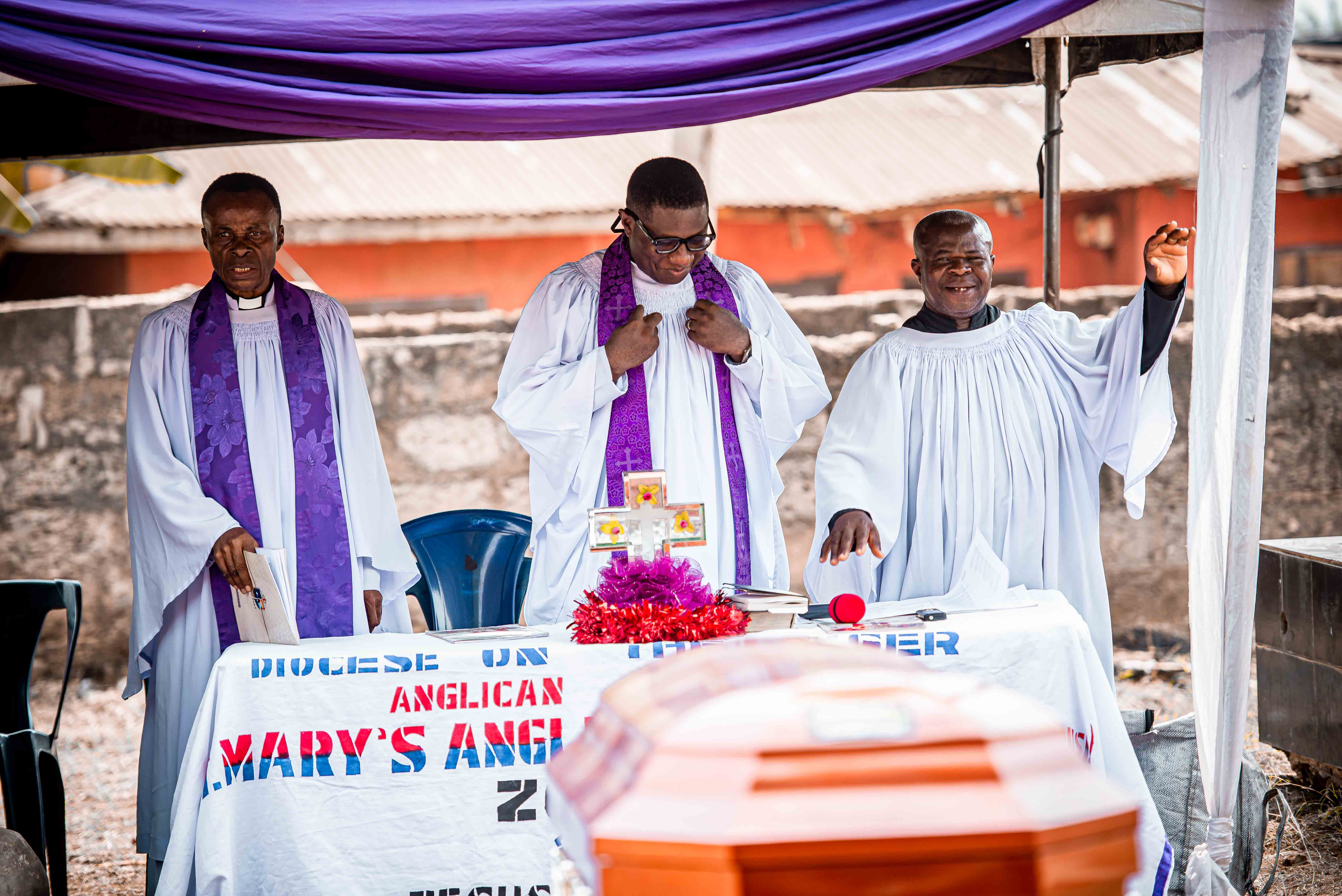
Funerals in 2026.

Originally part of Province Two of the Church of Nigeria when the church was divided into three provinces in 1997, Diocese on the Niger became a diocese in the Province of Niger when the Church was reorganised in 2002.

The cathedral church of the diocese is the Cathedral Church of All Saints, Ozala, Onitsha. Started in 1949, the completed cathedral was dedicated for worship on 1 November 1992.

The Bishop on the Niger is the ordinary of the diocese, and the current Bishop is the Rt. Revd. Owen Chidozie Nwokolo who was elected as Bishop in 2011.

== History ==
The history of the Diocese on the Niger dates back to the Niger expeditions of 1830–1857. After the 1841 expedition, the white missionaries realized that Africa was best evangelized by Africans. This realization led to Samuel Ajayi Crowther being given a prominent role in the mission team to West Africa especially, the Igbo mission. The mission train under the leadership Dr. William Baikie arrived Onitsha on Sunday, 26 July 1857. On 27 July 1857 the king of Onitsha, Obi Akazua and his elders-in-council gave the party a warm official welcome. Hence, 27 July came to be regarded as the beginning of the Church Missionary Society (CMS) mission in Igbo land.

The Rev. J.C. Taylor of Igbo origin played a vital role in the early mission activities in Igbo land. Taylor laid the foundation of the first Church in Igbo land in 1867, which was dedicated on 16 November 1870.

Samuel Crowther was ordained for the Niger mission on Trinity Sunday in 1844, and consecrated as the first ever black Anglican bishop on the Feast of St Peter, 29 June 1864, by Charles Longley, the Archbishop of Canterbury, at Canterbury Cathedral. By this consecration, he became the bishop of the Diocese of Equatorial West Africa, with its headquarters in Onitsha. The Diocese of Equatorial West Africa was the forerunner of the Diocese on the Niger.

== List of bishops ==
- Samuel Ajayi Crowther the first African Anglican Bishop in Africa; consecrated as Bishop of Western Equatorial Africa (Bishop in charge of the Niger Mission)
- 1893–1894 Joseph Sidney Hill
  - 1900–1917 James "Holy" Johnson, assistant bishop for the Niger Delta and Benin
- 1919–1921 Herbert Tugwell
  - 1920–1933: Adolphus Howells, Assistant Bishop (became Assistant in Lagos)
- 1922–1945 Bertram Lasbrey
- 1945–1969 Cecil Patterson
  - 1947–1957 Denis Hall, (Assistant Bishop)
  - 1949–1950 Ebenezer Dimieari, Assistant Bishop (became Bishop of the Niger Delta)
- 1955-1961 Samuel Nkemena, (Assistant Bishop)
- 1969–1975 Lucius Madubuko Uzodike
- 1975–2000 Jonathan Onyemelukwe (also Archbishop of Province Two and later Dean of the Church of Nigeria)
- 2000–2010 Ken Sandy Edozie Okeke
- 2011–present Owen Chidozie Nwokolo

== All Saints Cathedral ==
All Saints Anglican Cathedral at Onitsha is the seat of the Anglican Diocese on the Niger. The design of the main building is largely rectangular in structure with semi-parabolic arches constructed from concrete and ironstone. The first building to be completed was the Lady Chapel in 1952 and consecrated by Leslie Vining. The other structures built included a rectangular transeptal tower oblong in shape, a nave of four bays and a narthex porch. Planning of the cathedral began in 1946 after World War II, a site was chosen overlooking the Niger River and close to the river market in the city. Construction of the cathedral began when the foundation stone was laid by then colonial Governor John McPherson.

== The Anthem of the Diocese on the Niger ==
Lift high the banner, above let it fly;
Diocese on the Niger, laud to the skies.
First in the east banks, the Gospel did know
Bless we, He whom through Crowther, made it so.
Mother and Nurse of many infants Sees
Teacher of doctrine, unsullied by grease
Captain of Knights, in the Lord's martial train
Niger! Oh Niger! We hail you again! LUX FIAT!
