= McKay (rapper) =

- Born: Akorede Ezekiel Taiwo; 18 June 1997 (age 29); Nigeria
- Genre: Afrobeats
- Occupations: Rapper; record producer; singer; songwriter
- Years active: 2015–present
- Label: CAVIARR

Akorede Ezekiel Taiwo (born 18 June 1997), also known by his stage name McKay, is a Nigerian singer, songwriter and record producer.

== Biography ==
McKay was born in Lagos, Nigeria, where he grew up with his family and in 2013 he and his parents moved to Cape Town, South Africa.

In 2016, he released an album titled Genesis. In 2017, McKay released another EP titled Trappist 1 and also two songs titled “K” featuring King Genesis, and "LIL MOMMA PLEASE" featuring South African artist Tembisile. In 2018, McKay released another EP titled Trappist 2 which was ranked number 2 most streamed artist in South Africa by Spotify with more than 2 million streams on the app.

In 2026, he announced his upcoming project an album titled BITTERSWEET.

== Discography ==
=== Albums ===
- "Vibes & Melodies 2" (2025)

=== EPs ===
- ''KINGS n KNIGHTS'' (2015)
- ''Genesis'' (2016)
- ''Trappist 1'' (2017)
- ''Trappist 2'' (2018)
- "Vibes and Melodies" (2025)
- "A BEAUTIFUL TRAGEDY" (2025)
- "A BEAUTIFUL TRAGEDY: Slowed Reflections" (2025)

=== Singles ===
- "Breathe" (2024)
- "Sudden" (2024)
- "Letting go" (2025)
- “Melanin” (2025)
- "Medulla" (2025)
- "Unholy" (2025)
- "Without You" (2025)
- "On me" (2025)
- "FIRE" (2025)
- "Bella" (2025)
- "Omalicha" (2025)
- "SORRY" (2025)
- "ALL NIGHT LONG" (2025)
- "LET YOU DOWN" (2025)
- "Missing You" (2025)
- "Faaji" (2025)
- "Palm wine tapper" (2025)
- "FALL" (2026)
- "Fall Asleep" (2026)
- "Lonely Winter" (2026)
- “AWAY” (2026)
- "Kissing and Touching" (2026)
- “HGF” (2026)
- “LOW WAIST” (2026)
