= Ezekiel Awosoga =

Anglican bishop in Nigeria (1950–2020)

Ezekiel Awosoga (1950–2020) was an Anglican bishop in Nigeria. He was the Bishop of Ijebu from his consecration on 28 January 2005 until his death in 2020.

Ezekiel Ayo (or Ayodele) Awosoga was educated at Immanuel College, Ibadan and ordained in 1994. In his own words, "I did all that was assigned to me as vicar of churches, youth chaplain and chairman of the Board of Evangelism".

Before his election as bishop, he was Provost of the Cathedral of Our Saviour in Ijebu-Ode.
