= Anglican Diocese of Ijebu =

Anglican diocese in Nigeria

The Anglican Diocese of Ijebu is one of 13 dioceses within the Anglican Province of Lagos, itself one of 14 ecclesiastical provinces within the Church of Nigeria. The last bishop, Ezekiel Ayo Awosoga died in 2020. The current bishop is the Right Rev. Peter Rotimi Oludipe; he was consecrated a bishop on 21 September 2020 at the Cathedral Church of the Advent, Abuja; he is the fifth bishop diocesan.
