= Anglican Diocese of Egba West =

Anglican diocese in Nigeria

The Anglican Diocese of Egba West is one of 13 within the Anglican Province of Lagos, itself one of 14 ecclesiastical provinces within the Church of Nigeria. The current bishop is the Right Rev. Samuel Oludele Ogundeji. The diocese was erected from the Anglican Diocese of Egba and inaugurated on 22 April 2007.
