= Emmanuel Adekunle =

Anglican bishop in Nigeria (born 1962)

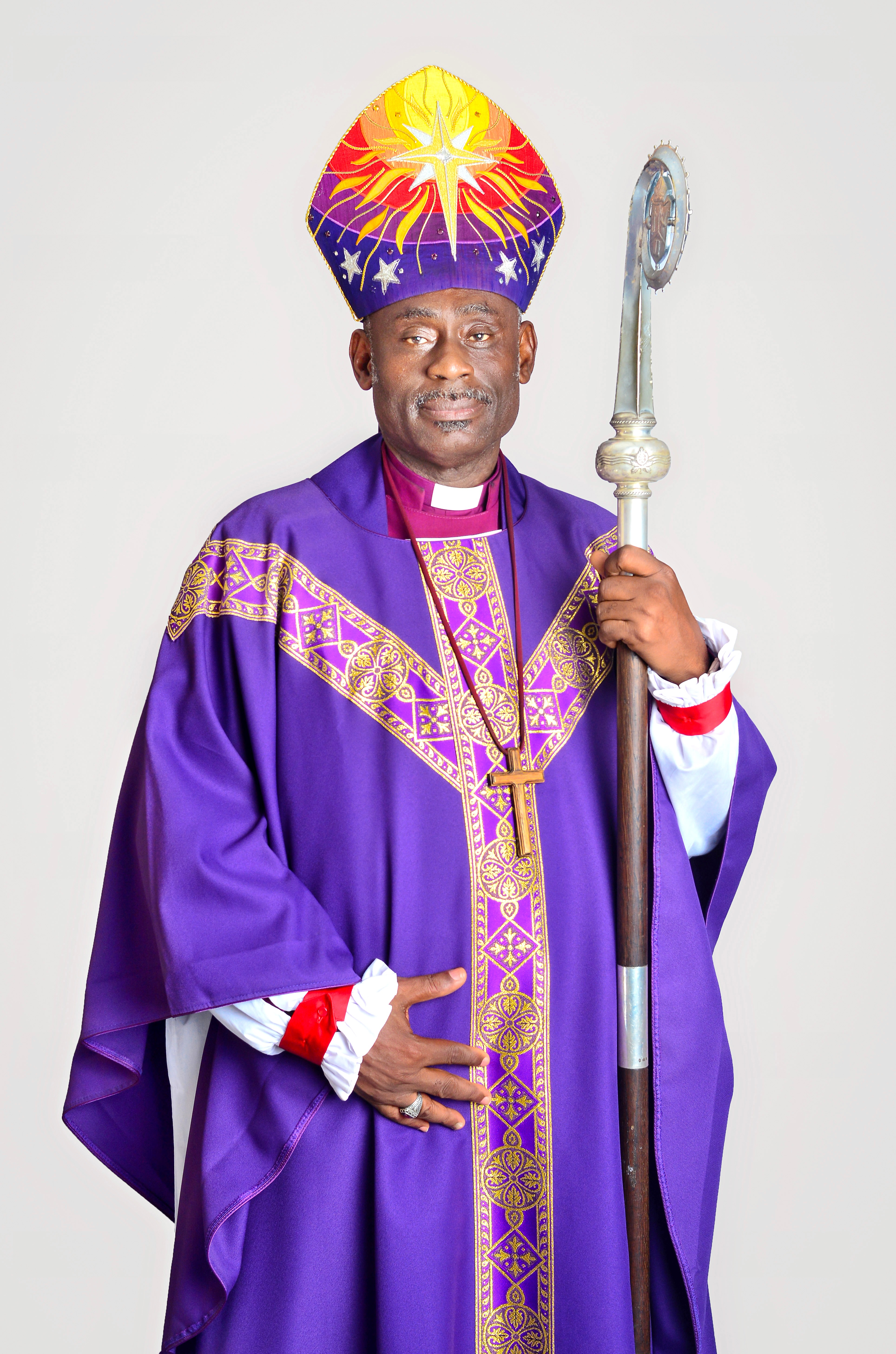
- Born: 1962 03 29th Abeokuta
- Education: Abeokuta Grammar school
- Occupation: Bishop

Emmanuel Oludaisi Adekunle is an Anglican bishop in Nigeria. He is the current Bishop of Egba.

Adekunle was born in Abeokuta on the 29 March 1962. He was educated at Abeokuta Grammar School, Federal Polytechnic Ilaro and Emmanuel College of Theology and Christian Education, Ibadan. A former teacher and engineer, he was ordained in 1993. He became a Canon in 1999 and an archdeacon in 2001. In 2006 he was appointed the Provost of the Cathedral of St. Peter, Abeokuta. He was consecrated on Sunday, 23 August, 2009 at the Cathedral Church of St. Jude, Ebute Metta, Lagos.
