= Anglican Diocese of Ekiti West =

Anglican diocese in Nigeria

The Anglican Diocese of Ekiti West is one of twelve dioceses within the Anglican Province of Ondo, itself one of 14 ecclesiastical provinces within the Church of Nigeria: the inaugural bishop was Samuel Oke and the current incumbent is the Right Rev. Rufus Victor Ajileye Adepoju. Adepoju was elected coadjutor and consecrated a bishop on 7 May 2017 at the Cathedral Church of Transfiguration of Our Lord in Owerri.
