= Cecil Patterson (bishop) =

Anglican bishop of Nigeria

Cecil John Patterson CBE CMG CFR (9 January 1908 – 11 April 1992) was an Anglican bishop in the mid part of the 20th century.

He was born in London, educated at St Paul's and St Catharine's College, Cambridge. He trained for ordination at Bishops' College, Cheshunt and was ordained deacon in 1931 and priest in 1932. He was a Curate at Holy Innocents, Kingsbury (1931–34) and then a Missionary in south Nigeria before his appointment to the episcopate as Assistant Bishop (1942) then Bishop on the Niger (1945). He was ordained and consecrated a bishop by Cosmo Lang, Archbishop of Canterbury, at St Paul's Cathedral, on Candlemas (2 February) 1942. In 1961 he became Archbishop of the Church of the Province of West Africa.

He retired in 1969 and his grave is in Richmond Cemetery. He had become a Doctor of Divinity (DD).
