= Adolphus Howells =

Nigerian clergyman

Adolphus Williamson Howells
- Born: 9 August 1866; Abeokuta
- Died: 3 December 1938

Adolphus Williamson Howells (9 August 1866 - 3 December 1938) was a Nigerian clergyman and an Anglican bishop in the 20th century. He became the first African vicar of the Pro-Cathedral Christ Church, Lagos in 1919.

== Early life ==
Howells was born on 9 August 1866 in Abeokuta.

== Education ==
Howells attended Ake School, Abeokuta before entering the CMS Training Institute in Lagos. He then went to study at Fourah Bay College, Freetown in 1891 and later at Durham University in England.

== Career ==
Howells began his career as a teacher at a mission school in Badagry, where he worked for one year from 1886 and was posted to Saint Paul's School (Breadfruit Street) in 1887. After returning to Lagos from England in 1894, he was appointed tutor at the CMS Grammar School, Lagos. Adolphus Howells was made deacon in 1897 and ordained priest two years later. He became curate of Christ Church Pro-Cathedral, Lagos in 1900 and later pastor of Saint John's Parish Aroloya where he served from 1902 before his posting in 1919 as the first African vicar of the Pro-cathedral Church of Christ. He was consecrated into bishop's orders on St John the Baptist's Day 1920 (24 June), by Randall Davidson, Archbishop of Canterbury, at St Paul's Cathedral. Bishop Howells was posted to the Niger Diocese (called Western Equatorial Africa at the time) as Assistant Bishop and served there until 1933 when he returned to Lagos Diocese to become the assistant to Bishop Melville Jones, who was the Bishop of Lagos. He was made the first resident Bishop of Abeokuta Ogun state on 10 March 1933.

== Later life and death ==
Howells served as Bishop of Abeokuta till his retirement on 10 August 1936. He died on 3 December 1938.
