= Joseph Abiodun Adetiloye =

Primate of the Church of Nigeria from 1986 to 1999

The Right Reverend Joseph Abiodun Adetiloye
- Primate of All Nigeria
- Church: Church of Nigeria
- See: Abuja
- In office: December 1986 - December 1999
- Previous post: Bishop of Lagos

Orders
- Consecration: 1970

Personal details
- Born: December 25, 1929 Odo-Owa, Colonial Nigeria
- Died: December 14, 2012 (aged 82) Odo-Owa, Nigeria
- Children: 1

Joseph Abiodun Adetiloye (25 December 1929 – 14 December 2012) was the former Primate of the Church of Nigeria. He was married briefly for 11 months, until his wife's death in 1968; they had a son.

== Biography ==
His father, who was a devout Christian, died when Adetiloye was aged 3 years old, and he and his siblings were raised by his mother. He entered school in 1937 and it was reported that "he was always neat in school each day despite the fact that he had only one uniform". He decided to become an Anglican priest at a very young age.

He passed with distinction is first school leaving examination in 1944 and was a teacher for 6 years. He was the acting church agent at St. Paul's Church in Ara-Yero, now called Araromi at his 6th year.

He decided to attend Melville Hall, in Kudeti, Ibadan, in 1949, to become a priest. He was further educated in England at King's College London (BD), and Wycliffe Hall, Oxford. He was ordained a deacon at the end of 1953 at the Cathedral Church of Lagos, by the first Archbishop of West Africa, Leslie Vining. He was a curate at St. Peter's Church, in Ake, Abeokuta, since 1954, latter was a chaplain to Archbishop Vining and afterwards to Archbishop Howells. This enabled him to move to Wycliffe Hall, to continue his studies. He was involved in some parish ministries at St. George in Leeds and was a curate at St. Mary's Church in Plaistow. Returning to Nigeria, the Adetiloye was a teacher at the Immanuel College of Theology in Ibadan, for four years and three months. On 10 August 1966, he became vicar and provost at the Cathedral Church of St. James, in Ibadan. In August 1970, he was elected and nominated bishop of the Diocese of Ekiti, latter being transferred to the Diocese of Lagos, of which he was bishop from 1985 to 1999.

He was enthroned as the second Primate of the Church of Nigeria on 26 December 1986, the following day to his 57th birthday, at the Cathedral Church of Lagos, by his predecessor, Archbishop Timothy O. Olufosoye. He retired in December 1999, after 13 years in office. During his tenure, the Church of Nigeria became a fast-growing church, increasing from 27 dioceses in 1986 to 76 in 1999. In 1997, the growth of the Church of Nigeria lead to a division into three ecclesiastical provinces. Archbishop Adetiloye headed the Province One, consisting of the dioceses in the West, while remaining Primate of All Nigeria.

His tenure is described by Elijah Olu Akinwumi: "His passion for evangelism and missions motivated him to judiciously mobilize financial resources from the Lagos diocese: directly, by challenging men to give and leading by his example; indirectly, by encouraging wealthy parishes to support seemingly weak ones or even planting new churches or opening a new diocese as the case may be. This move brought tremendous growth to the Anglican communion particularly in northern Nigeria."

Anglican Communion titles
Preceded by Timothy O. Olufosoye	Primate of the Anglican Church of Nigeria; 1986–1999	Succeeded by Peter Akinola
