= Otan Ayegbaju =

Otan-Ayegbaju Otan Aiyegbaju
- Town
- Otan Ayegbaju
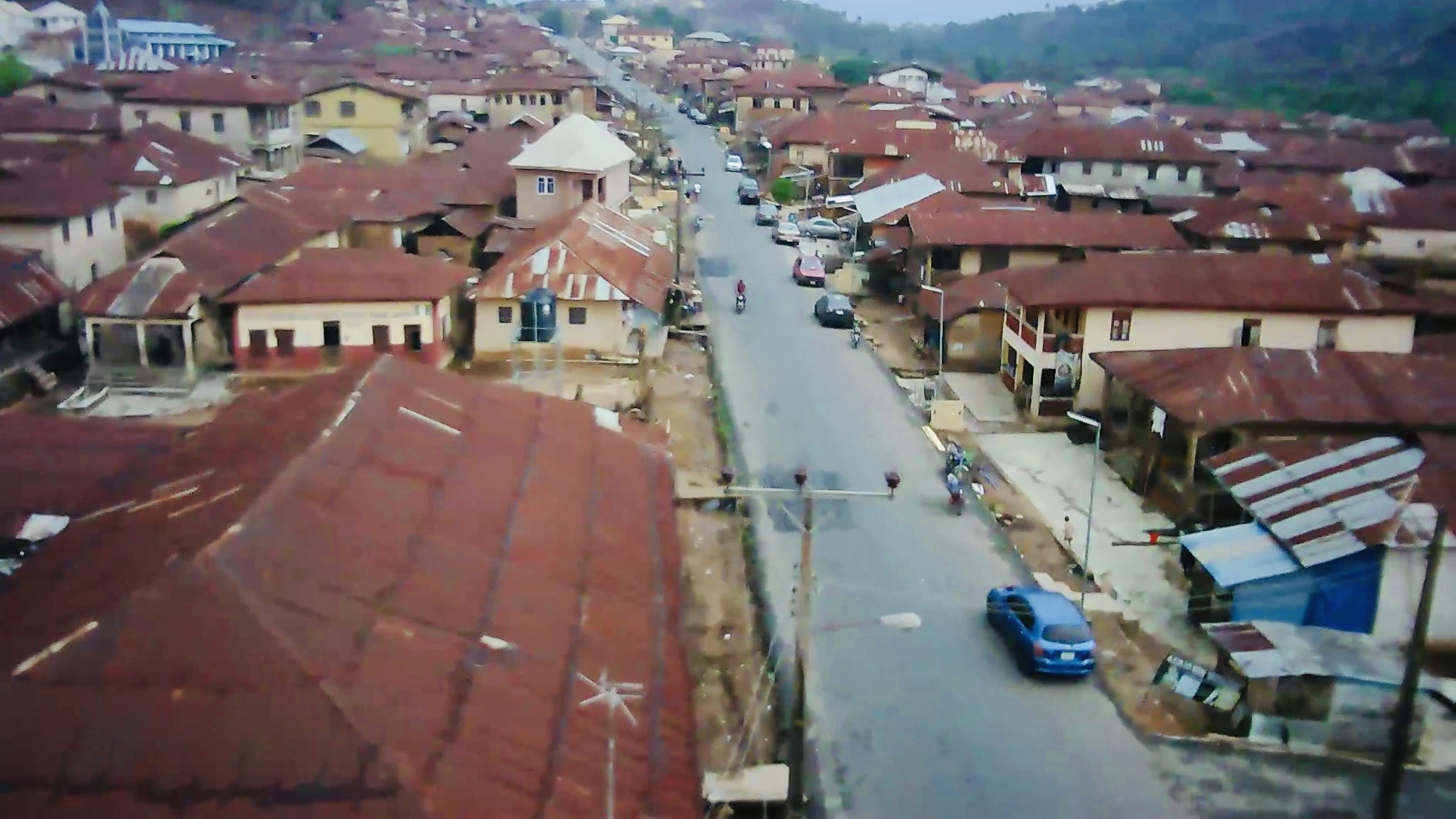

- Location of Otan Ayegbaju in Nigeria
- Coordinates: 7°57′N 4°48′E
- Country: Nigeria
- State: Osun
- Local Government area: Boluwaduro
- First settled: about 1300s
- Founder: Descendants of Oduduwa Olasooye Osilokun Osiloye

Government
  - Type: Monarchy
  - Owa of Otan Ayegbaju: Oba Lukman Adesola Ojo Fadipe, Arenibiowo II, Owa Olatanka III

Area
  - Total: 100 km^{2} (39 sq mi)

Otan-Ayegbaju is an historic town in Yorubaland founded about 800 years ago by descendants of Oduduwa, Olasooye Osilokun Osiloye the 16th child of Oduduwa who migrated from Ifẹ. It is the headquarters of Boluwaduro Local Government Area. Nearby towns are Eripa, Iresi, Igbajo, Oke-irun and Oyan. It's the seat of the Catholic Diocese of Osogbo Marian pilgrimage (Oke-Maria).

The Owa of Otan-Ayegbaju is the title given to the king. The town's government wasn't destroyed by inter-tribal wars. Grand children of Olasooye ruled after him such as Ajiboye, Oguntuyin, Laboyede, Adejimi and Oluyooye (Olua aka Baba Otan). Olua was the 6th Oba in Otan-Ayegbaju, he had wives and children. He was a very powerful hunter and Oba. He was called Olua after his demise by his people because as he was going to die; he took his friend from Ile Basemo (titled Agbaakin) to the bottom of what is now called Olua hill.

The current Owa is Oba Lukman Adesola Ojo Fadipe Arenibiowo II, Owa Olatanka III. He was installed in June 2009.

== Geography ==
Otan is located in the north-eastern area of Osun State, thirty-seven kilometres from Oshogbo, the state capital. It covers a land mass of 100 km^{2} (39 sq mi). Its terrain consists of hills, mountains, dense forest, vegetation and gullies. The climate is tropical with warm temperatures and low humidity.

Otan Ayegbaju borders with Eripa, Iresi, Oke-irun, Igbajo and Oyan.

== Climate ==
The rainy season in Otan-Ayegbaju is humid, oppressive, and cloudy, whereas the dry season is warm, muggy, and partially cloudy. The average annual temperature ranges from 17 to 32 degrees Celsius (62 to 90 degrees Fahrenheit), rarely falling below 13 °C (56 °F) or rising over 35 °C (95 °F).

Between 23 January and 31 March, which is the length of the hot season, the average daily high temperature is above 31 °C (88 °F). In Otan-Ayegbaju, March is the hottest month of the year, with an average high of 32 °C (89 °F) and low of 22 °C (71 °F).

The 3.8-month chilly season, which runs from 17 June to 11 October, has an average daily maximum temperature of less than 27 °C (81 °F). In Otan-Ayegbaju, August is the coldest month of the year, with average lows of 19 °C (67 °F) and highs of 26 °C (79 °F).

=== Cloud cover ===
Over the course of the year, Otan Ayegbaju suffers significant seasonal change in the average percentage of the sky covered by clouds.

Beginning about 16 November and lasting for 2.9 months, the clearer season in Otan-Ayegbaju ends around 13 February.

The sky is clear, mostly clear, or partly overcast 52% of the time on average in December, the clearest month of the year in Otan-Ayegbaju.

Beginning around 13 February and lasting for 9.1 months, the cloudier period of the year ends around 16 November.

April is the cloudiest month of the year in Otan-Ayegbaju, with an average of 84% of the time that the sky is overcast or largely cloudy during this month.

=== Rainfall ===
A day that has at least 1.0 millimetre (0.04 inches) of liquid or liquid-equivalent precipitation is considered to be wet. In Otan-Ayegbaju, the likelihood of rainy days varies wildly throughout the year.

In the 6.3-month-long wetter season, which runs from 14 April to 23 October, there is a larger than 43% chance that any given day would be rainy. September has an average of 25.0 days with at least 1.0 millimetre (0.04 inches) of precipitation, making it the month with the most rainy days in Otan-Ayegbaju.

Between 23 October and 14 April, or 5.7 months, is the dry season. December has an average of 0.7 days with at least 1.0 millimetre (0.04 inches) of precipitation, making it the month with the fewest wet days in Otan-Ayegbaju.

With an average of 25.0 days, September is the month in Otan-Ayegbaju with the most rainy days. According to this classification, rain alone has a peak probability of 85% on 21 September and is the most frequent type of precipitation over the entire year.
