= List of Virginia Theological Seminary people =

This is a partial list of people affiliated with Virginia Theological Seminary, located in Alexandria, Virginia, United States.

== Faculty ==
- C. FitzSimons Allison (born 1927), bishop of South Carolina, church historian
- Michael J. Battle (born 1963), theologian, vice president and associate dean
- Lowell Pierson Beveridge (1905–1991), musicologist, priest, first professor of speech and liturgics, and choral director
- Armistead L. Boothe (1907–1990), state legislator, director of development
- Stephen Lloyd Cook (born 1962), Old Testament scholar
- Avery Dulles (1918–2008), visiting professor
- Mark Dyer (1930–2014), professor of theology and director of spiritual formation
- Reginald H. Fuller (1915–2007), New Testament scholar
- A. Katherine Grieb (born 1949), New Testament scholar
- Christopher Hancock (born 1954), theologian
- Robert Heaney (born 1972), Professor of Theology and Mission
- John Johns (1796–1876), bishop of Virginia, president
- Lloyd A. Lewis (born 1947), New Testament scholar
- Ian Markham (born 1962), theologian, dean and president
- William Meade (1789–1862), bishop of Virginia, theologian and president
- Jack Moline (born 1952), rabbi, activist
- Robert Prichard (born 1949), church historian
- John H. Rodgers Jr. (1930–2022), systematic theologian
- Timothy F. Sedgwick (born 1946), theologian, associate dean
- Franklin Spencer Spalding (1865–1914), Episcopal bishop of Utah
- Henry St. George Tucker (1874–1959), bishop of Virginia, pastoral theologian
- William Holland Wilmer (1782–1827), founding instructor and later president of the College of William and Mary

== Alumni ==
- Gladstone B. Adams III (born 1952), bishop of Central New York
- G. T. Abraham, former bishop of the Diocese of Nandyal in the Church of South India
- Peter Akinola (born 1944), primate of the Church of Nigeria
- C. FitzSimons Allison (born 1927), bishop of South Carolina
- Marc Handley Andrus (born 1956), bishop of California
- Jacob Ashburn (1880–1955), member of the Ohio House of Representatives
- Scott Field Bailey (1916–2005), bishop suffragan of Texas, bishop of West Texas
- Stephen H. Bancroft (born 1946), dean of St. Paul's Cathedral in Detroit, Michigan, executive director of the Detroit Office of Foreclosure Prevention and Response
- Middleton Barnwell (1882–1957), bishop of Idaho, bishop of Georgia, president of Boise Junior College
- Gregory T. Bedell (1817–1892), bishop of Ohio
- Scott Benhase (born 1957), bishop of Georgia
- Karl M. Block (1886–1958), bishop of California
- Francis Eric Bloy (1904–1993), bishop of Los Angeles
- William Jones Boone (1811–1864), missionary bishop of Shanghai
- William Jones Boone Jr. (1846–1891), missionary bishop of Shanghai
- Samuel B. Booth (1883–1935), bishop of Vermont
- Walter Russell Bowie (1882–1969), priest, author
- Gregory Orrin Brewer, Bishop of Central Florida
- Phillips Brooks (1835–1893), preacher, author, bishop of Massachusetts
- George Browne (1933–1993), bishop of Liberia, archbishop of West Africa
- J. Jon Bruno (1946–2021), bishop of Los Angeles
- Mariann Edgar Budde (born 1959), bishop of Washington
- Charles Carpenter (1889–1969), bishop of Alabama
- Alison Cheek (1927–2019), one of the first women to be ordained to the priesthood in the Episcopal Church
- Charles E. Cheney (1836–1916), presiding bishop of the Reformed Episcopal Church
- Randolph Claiborne (1906–1986), bishop of Atlanta
- William J. Cox (1921–2025), suffragan bishop of Maryland
- Lloyd Rutherford Craighill (1886–1971), bishop of Anking, China
- John Croneberger (born 1938), bishop of Newark
- John Culmer (1891–1963), priest, activist (BPDS alumnus)
- Clifton Daniel (born 1947), bishop of East Carolina
- James Parker Dees (1915–1990), presiding bishop of the Anglican Orthodox Church
- Jane Dixon (1937–2012), bishop of Washington
- Harry Doll (1903–1984), bishop of Maryland
- Denise Giardina (born 1951), novelist
- Robert Atkinson Gibson (1846–1919), bishop of Virginia
- Terrell Glenn (born 1958), bishop in the Anglican Mission in the Americas and the Anglican Church in North America
- W. A. R. Goodwin (1869–1939), rector of Bruton Parish Church in Williamsburg, "the father of Colonial Williamsburg"
- William Gordon (1918–1994), bishop of Alaska
- Walter H. Gray, bishop of Connecticut
- A. Katherine Grieb (born 1949), New Testament scholar
- James Groppi (1930–1985), Roman Catholic priest, civil rights activist
- Edward Ambrose Gumbs, bishop of the Episcopal Diocese of the Virgin Islands
- Whit Haydn (born 1949), magician
- John Hines (1910–1997), bishop of Texas, presiding bishop of the Episcopal Church
- John Howard (born 1951), bishop of Florida
- George Nelson Hunt, III, 11th bishop of the Episcopal Diocese of Rhode Island
- James Addison Ingle (Yin Teh-sen) (1867–1903), missionary bishop of Hankou, China
- Carolyn Tanner Irish (born 1940), 10th bishop of Utah
- Stephen H. Jecko (1940–2007), 7th bishop of Florida
- Walter H. Kansteiner, III (born 1955), U.S. assistant secretary of state for African affairs
- Lukas Katenda (born 1978), 2nd bishop of REACH Namibia
- Russell Kendrick (born 1961), 4th bishop of Episcopal Diocese of the Central Gulf Coast
- James Allen Latané (1831–1902), presiding bishop of the Reformed Episcopal Church
- Quigg Lawrence, bishop suffragan of the Anglican Diocese of Christ Our Hope
- Neil Lebhar, bishop of the Gulf Atlantic Diocese
- Lloyd A. Lewis (born 1947), New Testament scholar
- Samuel T. Lloyd III (born 1950), dean of the Washington National Cathedral, rector of Trinity Church, Boston
- Henry I. Louttit (born 1938), bishop of Georgia
- Karin MacPhail, bishop of Southwestern Virginia
- Thomas Mar Makarios (1926–2008), bishop of the Malankara Orthodox Church
- Joseph Mar Thoma (born 1931), metropolitan of the Mar Thoma Church
- James Robert Mathes, fourth bishop of San Diego
- Frederica Mathewes-Green (born 1952), Eastern Orthodox author, activist
- Gerald Nicholas McAllister, bishop of the Episcopal Diocese of Oklahoma
- Randolph Harrison McKim (1842–1920), American Episcopal clergy and writer
- Martyn Minns (born 1943), missionary bishop of CANA
- Kate Moorehead (born 1970), dean of St. John's Cathedral in Jacksonville, Florida
- George M. Murray (1919–2006), bishop of Alabama
- Isaac Lea Nicholson (1844–1906), bishop of Milwaukee
- John Payne (1815–1874), bishop of Liberia
- Charles Clifton Penick (1843–1914), bishop of Cape Palmas, Africa
- William Stevens Perry (1832–1898), bishop of Iowa
- James Pike (1913–1969), bishop of California
- Leonidas Polk (1806–1864), planter, Confederate general, bishop of Louisiana
- Henry C. Potter (1835–1908), bishop of New York
- Noble C. Powell (1891–1968), bishop of Maryland
- William P. Remington (1879–1963), suffragan bishop of South Dakota and Pennsylvania, missionary bishop of Eastern Oregon
- Ann Ritonia, U.S. marine and Episcopal priest
- Phoebe Alison Roaf, bishop of West Tennessee
- John H. Rodgers Jr. (1930–2022), systematic theologian
- Sean W. Rowe (born 1975), bishop of Northwestern Pennsylvania
- Carrie Schofield-Broadbent (born 1974), 15th Bishop of Maryland
- Bennett Sims (1920–2006), bishop of Atlanta
- Melissa M. Skelton (born 1951), bishop of New Westminster
- John Shelby Spong (1931–2021), bishop of Newark
- Ernest M. Stires (1866–1951), bishop of Long Island
- Albert R. Stuart (1905–1973), bishop of Georgia
- William E. Swing (born 1936), bishop of California
- John T. Tarrant, bishop of South Dakota
- Philip Terzian (born 1950), editor of The Weekly Standard
- Beverley D. Tucker (1846–1930), bishop of Southern Virginia
- Francis Bland Tucker (1895–1984), Bible scholar, priest, hymn composer
- Henry St. George Tucker (1874–1959), missionary bishop of Osaka, bishop of Virginia, presiding bishop of the Episcopal Church
- John Poyntz Tyler (1862–1931), bishop of North Dakota
- John T. Walker (1925–1989), bishop of Washington
- Channing Moore Williams (1829–1910), missionary bishop of Shanghai, missionary bishop of Yedo in Japan
- Stephen D. Wood (born 1963), bishop of the Diocese of the Carolinas and archbishop of the Anglican Church in North America
- John F. Young (1820–1885), bishop of Florida
