= Christianity in the Gambia =

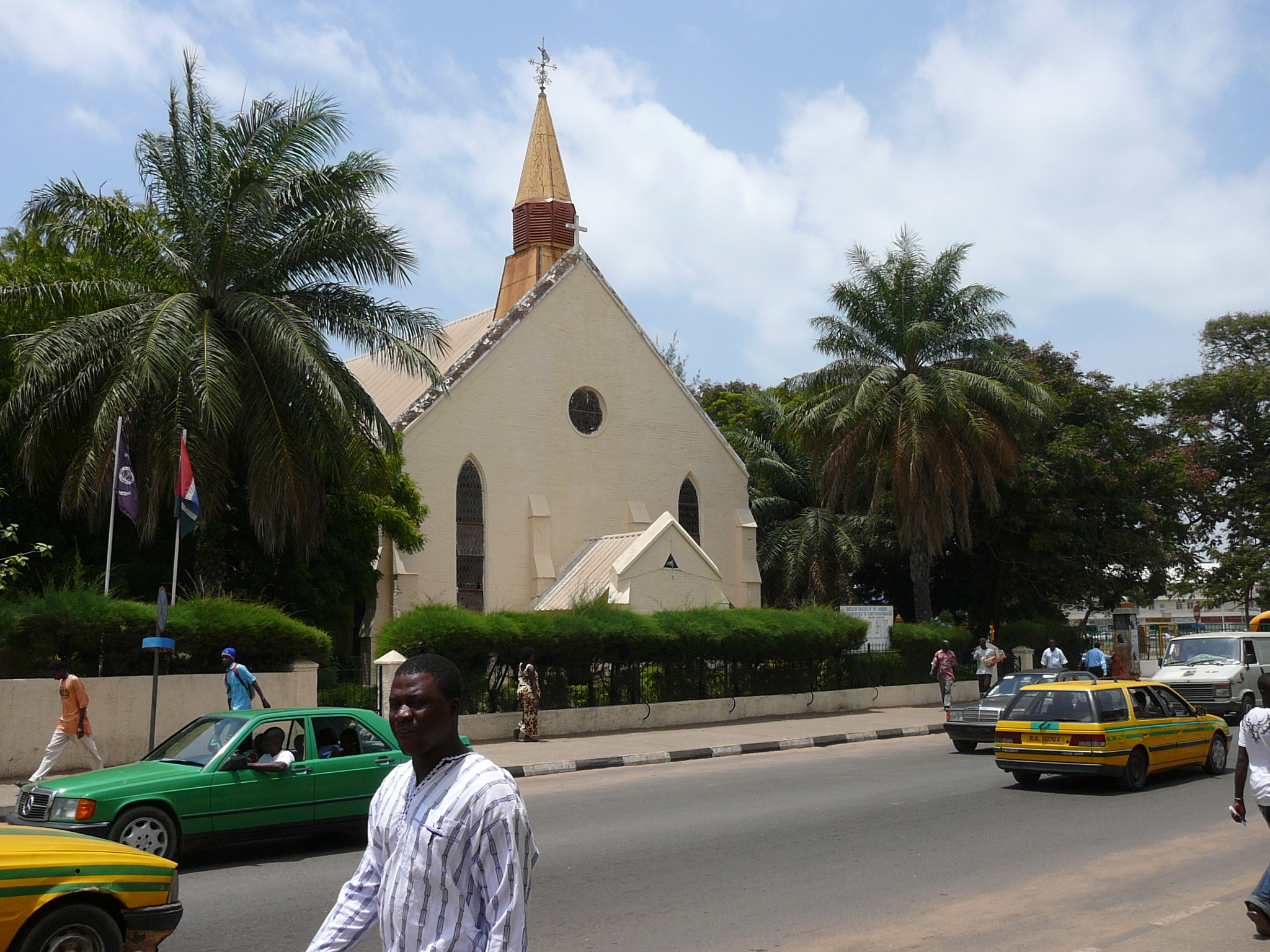
Saint Mary's Anglican Cathedral in Banjul

Christianity is a minority faith in The Gambia which is officially a secular country with no state religion, however the predominant religion is Islam, practised by approximately 96% of the country's population. Article 25 of the Constitution protects the rights of citizens to practise any religion that they choose.

The Christian community, situated mostly in the west and south of the country, is predominantly Roman Catholic. In 2007 there were also several Protestant groups including Anglicans, Methodists, Baptists, Seventh-day Adventists, and various small evangelical denominations. In 1965, the Gambia Christian Council was formed as an ecumenical association of Roman Catholic, Anglican, and Methodist churches.

Intermarriage between Muslims and Christians is common.

== Roman Catholicism ==
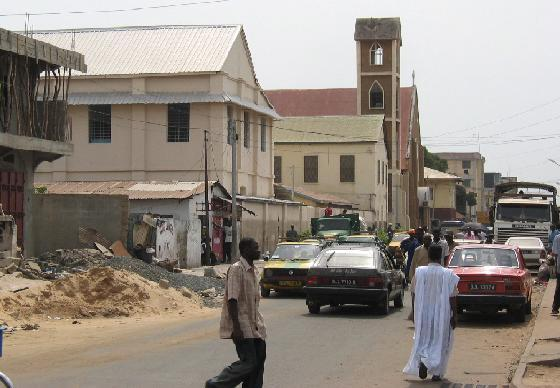
Cathedral of Our Lady of the Assumption in Banjul (the building with red roof)

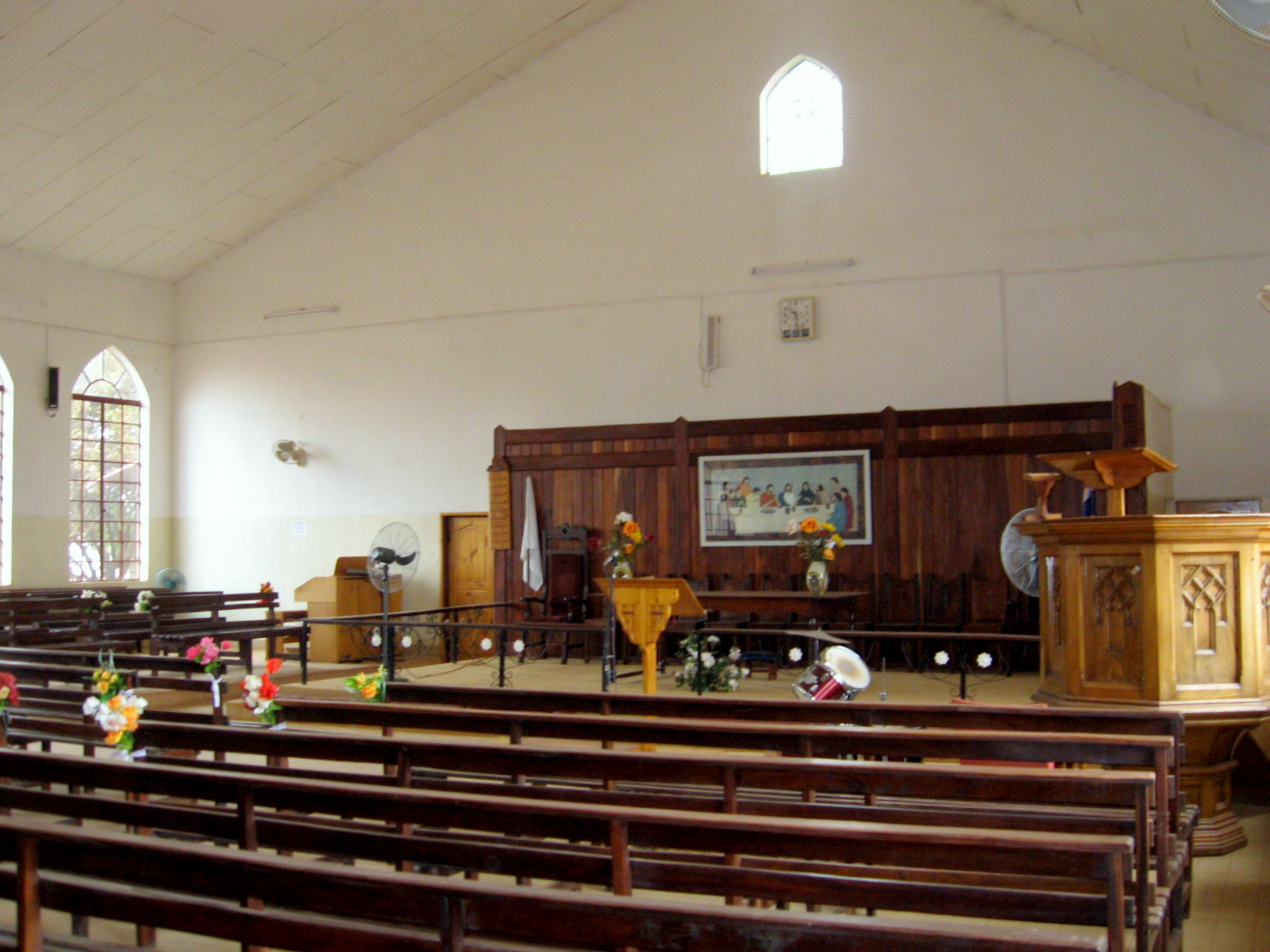
Interior of Trinity Methodist church, Serrekunda

The Mission “sui iuris” of The Gambia was established in 1931 from the Apostolic Vicariate of Senegambia.

The Mission was later promoted in 1951 to the Apostolic Prefecture of Bathurst, and in 1957 promoted again to Diocese of Bathurst. In 1974, it was renamed Diocese of Banjul. The diocese is divided into 56 parishes, with Catholics making up 2.9% of the population of The Gambia in 2020.

As of 2023, Gabriel Mendy (born 9 April 1967) is the Bishop of Banjul. He is the first Gambian to hold the position of bishop in the local Catholic Church.

== Anglicanism ==
The Anglican Diocese of Gambia and the Rio Pongas was founded in 1935. John Daly was the first bishop of the new diocese.

In 1951 five West African Anglican dioceses, including the Diocese of Gambia, were formed into the Church of the Province of West Africa. In 1985 from the Diocese of Gambia was separated the Diocese of Guinea and now the jurisdiction of Anglican Diocese of Gambia comprises the Republics of the Gambia, Senegal, and Cape Verde.

In 2000 the Church of the Province of West Africa adopted legislation permitting women priests, but only Liberia and the Gambia have passed enabling legislation and ordained women clergy.

Solomon Tilewa Johnson, who died in 2014, was the first Gambian national to hold the post of Anglican Bishop of Gambia. His successor, James Allen Yaw Odico has retired, and in 2023 St Obed Arist Kojo Baiden was elected to succeed him.

== See also ==
- Religion in the Gambia
- Islam in the Gambia
