= Church of the Province of West Africa =

Anglican province in West Africa

- Classification: Protestant (with various theological and doctrinal identities, including Anglo-Catholic, Liberal, Evangelical)
- Orientation: Anglican
- Scripture: Holy Bible
- Theology: Anglican doctrine
- Polity: Episcopal
- Primate: Cyril Kobina Ben-Smith
- Territory: Cameroon, Cape Verde, Gambia, Ghana, Guinea, Liberia, Senegal, Sierra Leone
- Members: c. 1,500,000

The Church of the Province of West Africa is a province of the Anglican Communion, covering 19 dioceses in eight countries of West Africa, specifically in Cameroon, Cape Verde, Gambia, Ghana, Guinea, Liberia, Senegal and Sierra Leone. Ghana is the country with most dioceses, now numbering 13.

Church of Senegal Anglican Communion was established by the Church of Nigeria. The Church is well known for her evangelical lifestyle and commitment towards the mission mandate "Seeking the lost and strengthening the faith of all believer.

The Reverend Bennett Chinonso Agazue is currently the mission Director at Church of Senegal Anglican Communion Dakar.

== History ==
Missionary work began in Ghana in 1752. The Church of the Province of West Africa was established in 1951 by the bishops of five West African dioceses (Accra, Lagos, Niger, Sierra Leone and the Diocese of Gambia and Guinea) with the consent of the Archbishop of Canterbury. In 1977 they were joined by the Diocese of Liberia. In February 1979, the new Church of Nigeria was inaugurated as a separate province. In 1981 Sierra Leone was divided into the Diocese of Freetown and the new missionary Diocese of Bo and four new Ghanaian dioceses of Cape Coast, Koforidua, Sekondi and Sunyani/Tamale were formed. In 1985 the Gambia and Guinea diocese was partitioned into English-speaking Gambia and French-speaking Guinea. The Diocese of Asante Mampong, previously a suffragan see to Kumasi, was inaugurated in November 2014.

The final total of 17 represents 11 dioceses in Ghana and 6 in the other seven nations. For this reason actions are in hand to move towards making Ghana a separate province. The country already has the status of an "internal province", the archbishop of which was until 2019 the Primate of the whole Province of West Africa.

Today, the church has to survive in areas of civil unrest where Christians remain a small minority.

List of archbishops

- 1951–1955 Leslie Gordon Vining (Bishop of Lagos)
- 1955–1961 James Lawrence Cecil Horstead (Bishop of Sierra Leone)
- 1961–1969 Cecil John Patterson (Bishop on the Niger)
- 1969–1981 Moses Nathanael Christopher Omobiala Scott (Bishop of Sierra Leone)
- 1981–1982 Ishmael Mills Le-Maire (Bishop of Accra)
- 1982–1993 George Daniel Browne (Bishop of Liberia)
- 1993–2003 Robert Garshong Allotey Okine (Bishop of Koforidua, Ghana)
- 2003–2012 Justice Ofei Akrofi (Bishop of Accra)
- 2012–2014 Solomon Tilewa Johnson (Bishop of Gambia and the Rio Pongas, and Archbishop of the internal province of West Africa)
- 2014–2019 Daniel Sarfo (Bishop of Kumasi, and Archbishop of the internal province of Ghana)
- 2019–2022 Jonathan B. B. Hart (Bishop of Liberia and Archbishop of the Internal Province of West Africa)
- 2022–present Cyril Kobina Ben-Smith (Bishop of Asante Mampong and Archbishop of the Church of the Province of West Africa)

== Membership ==
Today, there are over one million Anglicans out of an estimated population of 35 million in the countries that form the province.

== Structure ==
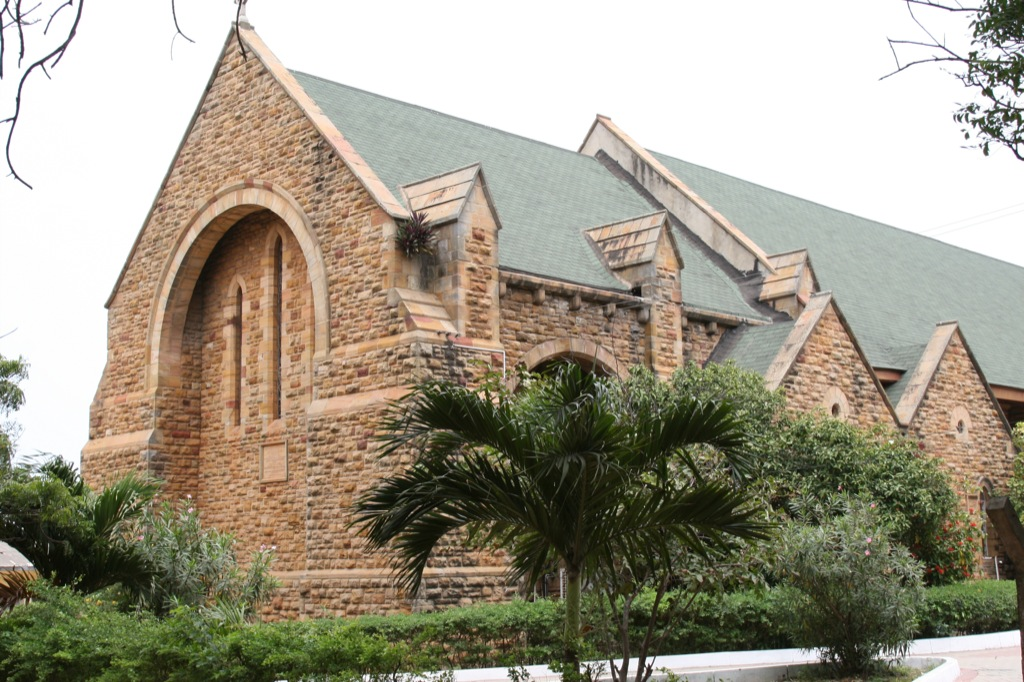
Holy Trinity Cathedral in Accra, Ghana

The polity of the Church of the Province of West Africa is episcopal church governance, which is the same as other Anglican churches. Geographical parishes are organized into dioceses, and since 2012 the dioceses have been grouped into internal provinces. There are 2 internal provinces (each led by a metropolitan archbishop) consisting of 17 dioceses (each led by a diocesan bishop).

=== Dioceses and bishops ===
Internal Province of West Africa

- Diocese of Bo – Emmanuel Tucker
- Diocese of Cameroon – Dibo Thomas-Babyngton Elango
- Diocese of Freetown – Thomas Arnold Ikunika Wilson
- Diocese of Gambia – James Allen Yaw Odico
- Diocese of Guinea – Jacques Boston
- Diocese of Liberia – Jonathan Bau-Bau Bonaparte Hart (Metropolitan archbishop and Primate)

Internal Province of Ghana

- Diocese of Accra - Daniel Torto
- Diocese of Asante Mampong - Cyril Kobina Ben-Smith (Metropolitan archbishop since 2021)
- Diocese of Cape Coast – Victor Atta-Baffoe
- Diocese of Ho – Matthias Mededues-Badohu
- Diocese of Koforidua – Felix Odei Annancy
- Diocese of Kumasi – Daniel Sarfo
- Diocese of Sekondi – John Otoo
- Diocese of Sunyani – Festus Yeboah Asuamah
- Diocese of Tamale – Jacob Kofi Ayeebo
- Diocese of Wiawso – Abraham Kobina Ackah
- Diocese of Dunkwa-on-Offin – Edmund Dawson Ahmoah

== Worship and liturgy ==
The Church of the Province of West Africa embraces three orders of ministry: deacon, priest, and bishop. A local variant of the Book of Common Prayer is used, as well as the Church of England Alternative Service Book which is used in the Diocese of Tamale on account of its more accessible use of modern English.

== Doctrine and practice ==
The center of the Church of the Province of West Africa's teaching is the life and resurrection of Jesus Christ. The basic teachings of the church, or catechism, includes:

- Jesus Christ is fully human and fully God. He died and was resurrected from the dead.
- Jesus provides the way of eternal life for those who believe.
- The Old and New Testaments of the Bible were written by people "under the inspiration of the Holy Spirit". The Apocrypha are additional books that are used in Christian worship, but not for the formation of doctrine.
- The two great and necessary sacraments are Holy Baptism and Holy Eucharist
- Other sacramental rites are confirmation, ordination, marriage, reconciliation of a penitent, and unction.
- Belief in heaven, hell, and Jesus's return in glory.

The threefold sources of authority in Anglicanism are scripture, tradition, and reason. These three sources uphold and critique each other in a dynamic way. This balance of scripture, tradition and reason is traced to the work of Richard Hooker, a sixteenth-century apologist. In Hooker's model, scripture is the primary means of arriving at doctrine and things stated plainly in scripture are accepted as true. Issues that are ambiguous are determined by tradition, which is checked by reason.

== Ordination of women ==
At its 20th Provincial Synod in 2000, the Province approved in principle the ordination of women to the priesthood. There is currently a variety of practice from diocese to diocese, with some remaining closed to the ordination of women as priests, and others welcoming the practice. While the province does permit the ordination of women to the priesthood, it does not permit the ordination of women to the episcopate.

== Ecumenical relations ==
Like many other Anglican churches, the Church of the Province of West Africa is a member of the ecumenical World Council of Churches.

== Anglican realignment ==
The Church of the Province of West Africa was one of the first Anglican provinces to break communion with the Episcopal Church of the United States over the question of allowing the blessing of same-sex unions and non-celibate homosexual clergy. However, the Episcopal Diocese of Liberia continues to maintain full communion and a covenant relationship with The Episcopal Church. The Church of the Province of West Africa has been active in the Anglican realignment as a member of the Global South and the Global Anglican Future Conference. Archbishop Justice Akrofi was a founding Primate of GAFCON in 2008. Archbishop Solomon Tilewa Johnson attended Global Anglican Future Conference (GAFCON II), that took place in Nairobi, Kenya, from 21 to 26 October 2013. Unlike his predecessors, Archbishop Daniel Sarfo was seen as a supporter of "reconciliation" between the conservative and liberal provinces of the Anglican Communion, particularly the Episcopal Church and Anglican Church of Canada, and was involved in several meetings between African and North American bishops. He didn't attended any GAFCON meetings. He still was one of the 11 Primates that attended the 3rd Provincial Assembly of the Anglican Church in North America, in June 2017. He also attended the Global South meeting, in 8–9 September 2017, in Cairo, Egypt, and was one of the signatories of their communiqué, with nine other Anglican Primates, including Foley Beach, from the Anglican Church in North America.

The province was represented at GAFCON III, held in Jerusalem, on 17–22 June 2018, by a 13 members delegation, coming from Ghana, Gambia, Guinea and Sierra Leone.

The GAFCON Primates Council announced at their Communiqué, on 6 May 2019, that the Diocese of Sunyani would be developing the official branch of the movement in Ghana, under the leadership of the Bishop Festus Yeboah Asuamah.

Archbishop Jonathan Hart attended the 7th Global South Conference, held in Cairo, Egypt, on 11–12 October 2019. Archbishop Hart opposes the legalisation of same-sex marriage and opposes the blessing of same-sex relationships in churches.

In 2021, the Anglican province received public media attention as well as scrutiny from within the Anglican Communion due the Diocese of Ghana's endorsement of legislation to criminalise LGBTQ advocacy and to increase penalties for same-sex relationships; homosexual sexual relationships are already illegal in Ghana. Archbishop Justin Welby of the Church of England, whose office is one of the instruments of unity within the Anglican Communion, issued a statement rebuking the bishops in Ghana and reiterated his support for LGBTQ civil rights. The Church of England's Archbishop of York, Stephen Cottrell, and Bishop of London, Sarah Mullally, also issued statements denouncing the anti-LGBTQ actions of the Ghanaian bishops.

In 2026, archbishhop Cyril Kobina Ben-Smith said, that criminalization of same-sex acts has no support by him and the Church of the Province of West Africa.
