= Joseph Dadson =

Ghanaian Anglican clergyman

Joseph Kobina Dadson (born 15 May 1928) is a Ghanaian Anglican clergyman. He was Bishop of Sunyani-Tamale from 1981 to 1997.

== Biography ==
Dadson was born on 15 May 1928, and educated at the University of Ghana. He was ordained in 1958 and served in the Diocese of Accra as a Military chaplain. He was Archdeacon of Accra from 1978 to 1981; and Vicar general of Accra from 1980 to 1981.
