= Grace Nkansa Asante =

Ghanaian lecturer

Grace Nkansa Asante (née Ofori‐Abebrese; born 1965) is a Ghanaian lecturer and the Vice Dean at the Faculty of Social Sciences of the College of Humanities and Social Sciences at the Kwame Nkrumah University of Science and Technology (KNUST). She is also considered as the first Ghanaian female Professor of Economics.

== Career ==
Asante is also an Anglican priest for the Anglican Diocese of Kumasi, Church of the Province of West Africa. In 2025, she was selected as the Anglican Communion representative the Africa region on the Crown Nominations Commission to elect the next Archbishop of Canterbury.

== Education ==
She obtained her first degree in French and Economics at the Kwame Nkrumah University of Science And Technology. She then obtained her second degree at the University of Ghana, Legon. Her PHD was obtained at the Kwame Nkrumah University of Science and Technology where she was honored as the first Ghanaian Female professor of Economics.
