= Episcopal Diocese of Liberia =

Anglican Communion in Liberia

The Episcopal Diocese of Liberia is a diocese in the Anglican Communion founded by missionaries from the Episcopal Church.

During the 1851 General Convention of the Episcopal Church, the Rev. John Payne, a missionary from Virginia was consecrated as missionary bishop for Cape Palmas and other areas of West Africa, which became Liberia.

The name of the jurisdiction was changed to the Missionary District of Liberia on October 17, 1913, and to the Episcopal Diocese of Liberia on January 1, 1970.

In 1951, the Archbishop of Canterbury authorized creation of the Province of West Africa. On March 18, 1982, the diocese of Liberia joined the Church of the Province of West Africa.

Although some Anglican churches in Africa recently broke away in a dispute concerning the ordination of homosexuals as clergy, the Episcopal Diocese of Liberia remains in full communion and maintains a covenant relationship with The Episcopal Church.

== Bishops ==
Bishops of the Episcopal Diocese of Liberia include:

- John Payne (1851-1871)
- John Gottlieb Auer (1873-1874)
- Charles Clifton Penick (1874-?)
- Samuel David Ferguson (1885-1916)
- Walter H. Overs (1919-)
- Theophilus Momolu Gardiner (1921-
- Robert E. Campbell (bishop) (1925-1936)
- Leopold Kroll (1936-1945)
- Bravid W. Harris (1947-1964)
- Dillard H. Brown Jr. (1961-1969)
- George Browne (1970-1989)
- Edward W. Neufville (1996-2007)
- Jonathan Hart (2007- )
- Wilmot Merchant II, missionary bishop, (2026-)
