= Jonathan Hart =

Jonathan Hart may refer to:

- Jonathan Hart (poet)
- Jonathan Hart (bishop)
- Jonathan Hart, co-lead character of the American TV series Hart to Hart, played by Robert Wagner
- Jonathan Hart Jr., an episode of the TV series Hart to Hart
