= St Obed Arist Kojo Baiden =

Bishop of Gambia

The Right Reverend St Obed Arist Kojo Baiden
- Bishop of Gambia
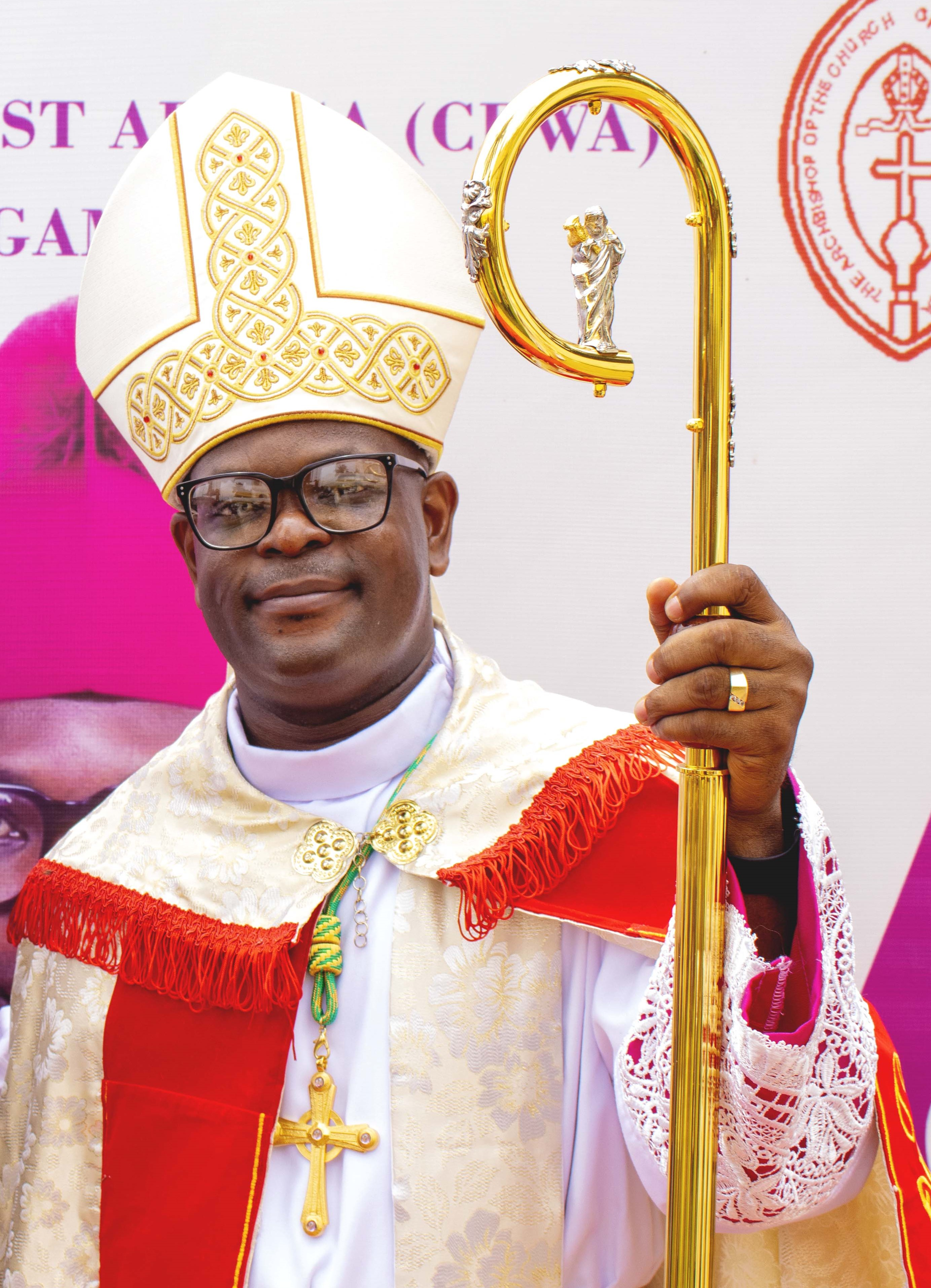
- Bishop Baiden in 2023
- Church: Anglican Communion
- Province: Church of the Province of West Africa
- Diocese: Anglican Diocese of Gambia
- Elected: 27 January 2023
- Installed: 18 June 2023
- Predecessor: James Allen Yaw Odico

Orders
- Ordination: 11 August 2013 (Deacon); 10 May 2014 (Priest)
- Consecration: 17 June 2023 by Cyril Kobina Ben-Smith

Personal details
- Born: 30 July 1984 (age 42) Sekondi, Ghana
- Spouse: Naomi Obaapa Adjei Konadu Saint-Baiden
- Profession: Clergyman, lawyer
- Education: St Mary’s Minor Seminary; St Paul’s Major Seminary; St Peter’s Regional Seminary; Mountcrest University College; Gambia Law School
- Motto: Prayerful service to God and selfless service to His people

St Obed Arist Kojo Baiden (born 30 July 1984) is the eighth Bishop of the Anglican Diocese of Gambia, part of the Church of the Province of West Africa (CPWA).

== Theological background ==
Baiden began his seminary training after turning down an offer of admission to the Ghana Secondary Technical School, opting to attend St Mary's Minor Seminary at Apowa instead. This began his seminary formation that would last 14 years.

He gained entrance to St Paul's Major Seminary at Sowutuom, Accra and then later to St Peter's Regional Seminary at Cape Coast, where he obtained a First Class in Philosophy, Religion and Sociology, graduating with a BA (Hons) degree.

Baiden was made a deacon in 2013 at St John the Divine Anglican Church in Winneba. He was ordained to the priesthood on 10 May 2014 at St James Anglican Church, Elmina.

He was ordained and consecrated on Saturday 17 June 2023 and enthroned on Sunday 18 June 2023 as the eighth Bishop of Gambia at St Mary's Cathedral in Banjul.

== Legal training ==
Baiden is a trained lawyer, having read law at Mountcrest University College, Accra, graduating with a Bachelor of Laws (LLB) in 2015.

On 14 March 2018, he was called to the Gambian Bar by the General Legal Counsel as Solicitor and Barrister of the Supreme Court of The Gambia, having graduated from the Gambia Law School as the overall second-best student and overall best student in the Law of Evidence with a degree of Barrister-at-Law (BL).

On 5 October 2018, Lawyer Kojo Baiden was called and enrolled to the Ghana Bar as Solicitor and Barrister of the Supreme Court of Ghana, with right of practice in both Ghana and The Gambia.
