= Emmanuel Arongo =

Emmanuel Arongo was an Anglican bishop in Ghana: he was Bishop of Tamale from 1997 to 2010.
