= Francis Thompson (bishop) =

Francis William Banahene Thompson was Bishop of Accra from 1983 to 1996.

Ordained in 1964 after a period of study at Kelham Theological College, he was a chaplain to the Ghanaian forces from 1968.

Church of England titles
Preceded by Ishmael Mills Le-Marie	Bishop of Accra; 1983–1996	Succeeded by Justice Akrofi
