= Anglican Diocese of Gambia =

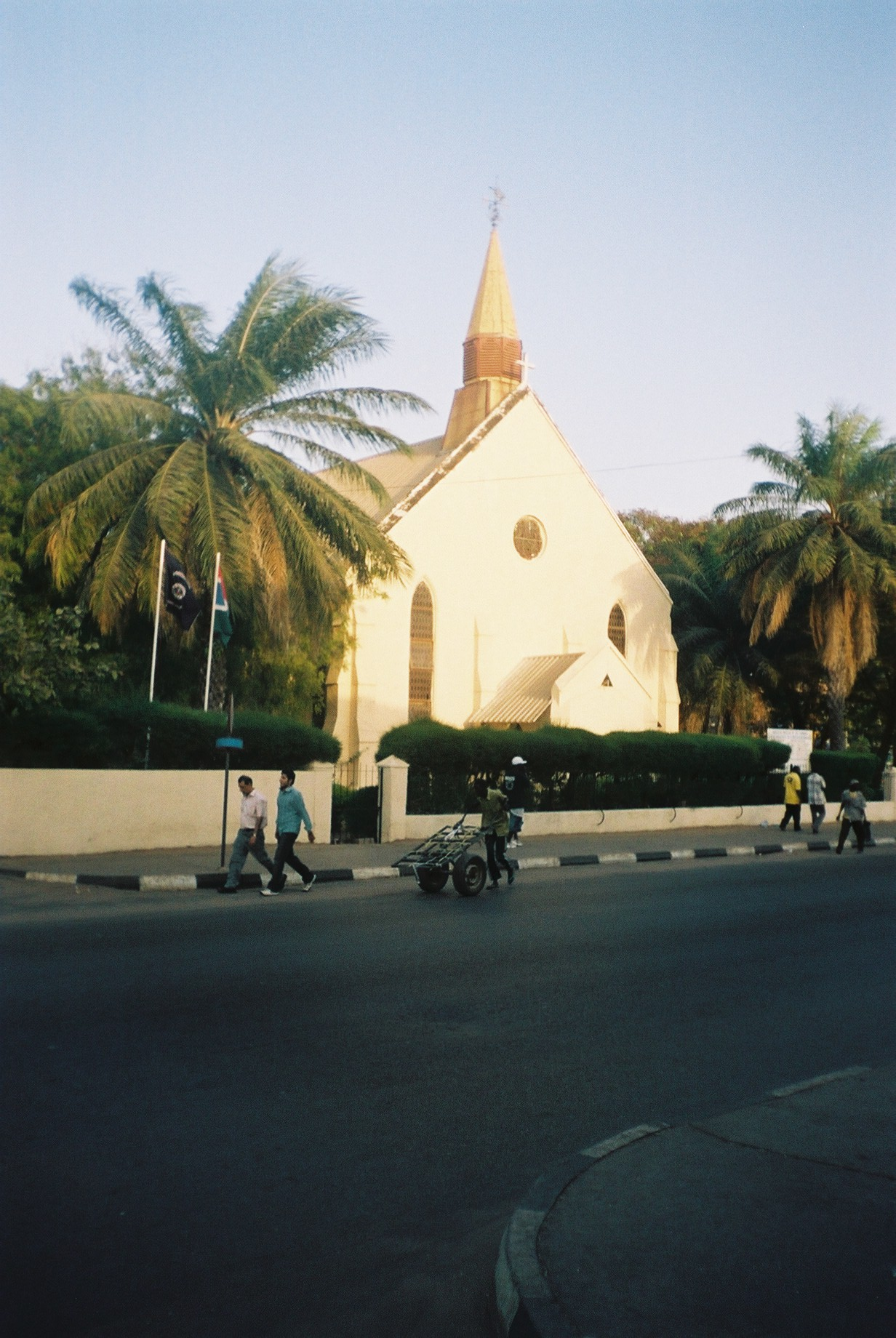
St Mary's Cathedral, Banjul

The Diocese of Gambia and Guinea was founded in 1935 and had been renamed the Diocese of Gambia and The Rio Pongas by 1940. Today it is simply styled the Diocese of Gambia, is one of 17 dioceses in the Church of the Province of West Africa, and comprises The Gambia, Senegal, and the Cape Verde Islands. In 1985, French-speaking Guinea was split off from it to form the Anglican Diocese of Guinea.

== Provincial structure ==
In 1981 the Diocese of Gambia and The Rio Pongas was one of the five dioceses, along with Freetown, Niger, Accra, and Lagos, which formed the new Province of West Africa. The Province of West Africa has now grown to include 17 dioceses, and in 2014 was sub-divided into two internal provinces (West Africa and Ghana), each led by a metropolitan archbishop.

== Diocesan institutions ==
The first Anglican mission church in The Gambia Includes Senegal and Cape Verde Islands was established in 1855. Early church missions were established by the USPG and Church Mission Society. Early mission stations and chaplaincies formed the initial parishes of the new diocese upon its formation in 1935.

The cathedral church of the diocese is St Mary's Cathedral, which was built in 1901 in Bathurst, The Gambia, now Banjul.

The diocese has active components of the Mothers' Union and the Anglican Young Peoples Association. In 2012 the diocesan synod committed to establishing local branches of both organisations in every parish, with a view to developing the role of both women and young people in church life.

During the leadership of the sixth Bishop, Solomon Johnson, the name of the diocese was officially shortened to simply Diocese of Gambia. Johnson became Archbishop of West Africa in 2012, but died suddenly in 2014, after which there was a gap of over a year before a new bishop was named.

The position of bishop was held by James Allen Yaw Odico, formerly the Dean of St Mary's Cathedral, who was consecrated and enthroned on 24 January 2016.

Currently, the position of bishop is held by St. Obed Arist Kojo Baiden (Ghanaian), formerly the Vickar General of the Diocese, who was consecrated and enthroned on the 17 and 18 June,2023 respectively.

== List of Bishops ==
Bishop of Gambia and the Rio Pongas

- 1935–1951 John Charles Sydney Daly (initially styled Bishop of Gambia and Guinea) (afterwards Bishop of Accra, 1951)
- 1951–1957 Roderic Norman Coote
- 1958–1963 St John Surridge Pike (returned to England as Assistant Bishop of Guildford)
- 1965–1971 Timothy Omotayo Olufosoye (Primate of the Anglican Church of Nigeria, 1979–86)
- 1972–1986 Jean Rigal Elisée
- 1990–2014 Solomon Tilewa Ethelbert Willie Johnson (Later styled simply Bishop of Gambia) (Archbishop of West Africa, 2012–2014)

Bishop of Gambia

- 2016–2022 James Allen Yaw Odico
- 2023–present Obed Arist Kojo Baiden

== See also ==
- Christianity in the Gambia
