= Moses Scott =

Moses Nathanael Christopher Omobiala Scott CBE (18 August 1911 – 9 May 1988) was an Anglican bishop, a Bishop of Sierra Leone who later became Archbishop of the Province of West Africa.

Born on 18 August 1911 and educated at a CMS Grammar School and Fourah Bay College in Sierra Leone he was ordained in 1946. He was a Curate at Lunsar then Priest in charge at Makeni. In 1950 he came to study at St John's College, Nottingham and after that was a Curate at Grappenhall, Cheshire from 1951 to 1953 and then the incumbent at Bo in his home country. Later he was Archdeacon of Bonthe before appointment to the episcopate. In 1969 he became the province's primate, retiring in 1981.

During the 1978 Lambeth Conference, on 1 August, Scott preached at a service of Festal Evensong in Westminster Abbey in London.

He died on 9 May 1988.

Religious titles
Preceded by James Horstead	Bishop of Sierra Leone; 1961–1981	Succeeded by Prince Thompson
Preceded by Cecil Patterson	Archbishop of West Africa; 1969–1981	Succeeded by Ishmael Mills Le-Maire
