= St. Thomas Aquinas Senior High School =

Public senior high day school in Cantonments, Accra, Greater Accra Region, Ghana

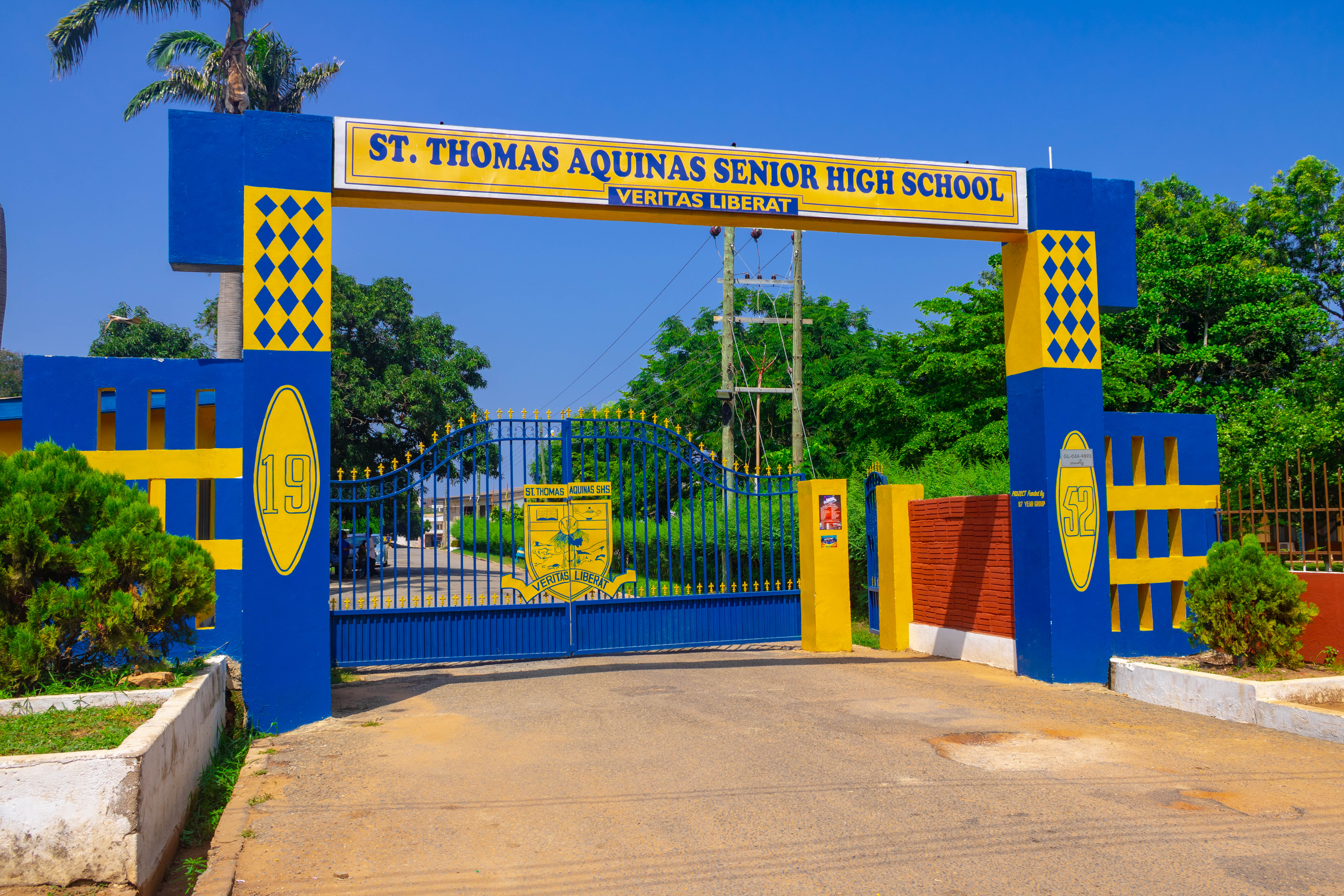
- The entrance of St. Thomas Aquinas Senior High School
- Cantonments, Accra, Ghana

Information
- Established: 1952
- Head teacher: George Obeng Appah
- Gender: Boys

St. Thomas Aquinas Senior High School is a Ghanaian public day senior high school for boys in the Osu district of Accra in the Greater Accra Region. It was established in 1952. The school is currently located in Cantonments, a suburb of Accra. It was established to provide education for boys of the Accra Archdiocese of the Catholic church whose parents could not afford the cost of sending their male children to expensive boarding schools.

== Location ==
In September 1963, the school relocated to its present, permanent site at Cantonment Street, Osu.

The school is situated opposite the European Union office and the Civil Service Training School, laying between the Cantonment Police Station to its south and the Embassy of Togo to its north, with close proximity to the prime area of the commercial and administrative hub of Osu's Oxford Street.

== History ==
On January 15, 1952, Catholic missionaries founded the Saint Thomas Aquinas Secondary School in the Greater Accra Region on the current site of St. Peter's Catholic Church.

In order to educate boys in the Catholic tradition, Roman Catholic missionaries were in the forefront in the establishment of schools throughout Ghana. The Most Rev. Adolph Alexander Noser, the Roman Catholic Bishop of Accra, established the school with a small enrollment of fifty pupils in a two-story home near the seashore in Osu-Anohor.

Three Society of the Divine Word (SVD) Reverend Fathers made up the initial staff: Father George Wilson and Father Fisher, Mr. Augustine Adu, Father Paul Baddoo, and the first headmaster, Father Alphonse Elsbernd. Thirty-one students and eight staff members attended the school when Father Clement Hotze assumed headmaster duties in March 1954. Hotze was aware that two key initiatives were necessary for the school to grow properly: government support and West African Examinations Council approval. Even after his efforts were acknowledged in January and April of 1957, he never got weary of working on these initiatives.

After Rev. Father John McKillip took over as headmaster in 1957, the school was authorized by the West African Examinations Council (WAEC) to submit candidates for the Ordinary Level Examination. Fr. Hotze had a 100% pass record when he submitted the first candidate for the School Certificate Examination in November 1955; this was a point in his crown because just one applicant was presented and one of them passed.

== Curriculum ==
The school runs nine streams and five academic programmes.

- Business
- Agriculture
- Visual arts
- General arts
- General science

== Awards and recognition ==
For three consecutive years, 1972, 1973, 1974, the school led West Africa in the Advanced Level Certificate Examination according to statistical figures from the Education Ministry. In 2004, the school won the world cadet championship held in London. In 2013, the school was deemed the Overall Best High School in Ghana. The same year, 2013, the school won the National Science and Maths Quiz Competition.

In June 30, 2026 the school emerged winner of the Visual art contest under the first phase of the BTS Ghana Research Project Dissemination. This win further established the school as one of the best in the Greater Accra Region in arts.

== Notable alumni ==
- John Owusu Gyapong Vice Chancellor, The University of Health and Allied Sciences, Ho and Former Pro Vice Chancellor, University of Ghana, Legon
- George Hagan – academic and Politician (Convention People's Party's presidential candidate, 2000 general elections, Ghana)
- Abednego Feehi Okoe Amartey, Vice Chancellor of the University of Professional Studies
- Nii Ashie Kotey – academic and justice of the Supreme Court of Ghana (2018–2023) and Former Chief Executive of the Forestry Commission of Ghana, Dean of the Faculty of Law, University of Ghana, Legon and Acting Director of the Ghana School of Law.
- Daniel McKorley — entrepreneur, businessman and founder and CEO of McDan Group of Companies.
- D. S. M. Torto (1978 year group) – bishop, Anglican Diocese of Accra
- Vincent Boi-Nai – Catholic Bishop of Yendi Diocese
- Sylvester A. Mensah, politician
- Lord Oblitey Commey, politician and director of operations at the Flagstaff House, the official residence and office of the President of Ghana
- Benjamin Narteh Ayiku - Member of Parliament for Ledzokuku Constituency
- Augustine Tawiah - Member of Parliament for Bia West Constituency
- DJ Vyrusky Kofi Amoako - Official DJ of Shatta Wale and Lynx Entertainment
- Laud Quartey - footballer
- Elijah Amoo Addo - Chef and food stylist
- Yaw Amankwah Mireku - Former Hearts of Oak and Black Stars Player.
- Abel Manomey - Former Great Olympics and Dreams Player.

== Former headteachers ==
Name	Period
Rev. Fr. A. Elsbernd	January 1952 – March 1954
Rev. Fr. C. Hotze	April 1954 – April 1956
Rev. Fr. J. Mckillip	May 1956 – August 1957
Rev. Fr. E. Datig	September 1957 – September 1958
Rev. Fr. M. Lessage	July 1958 – September 1968
Rev. Fr. J. Mckillip	September 1968 – June 1978
D. D. Dumfeh	September 1978 – August 1980
C. K. Koomsom	October 1980 – September 1985
Rev. Fr. S. K. Batsa	September 1985 – January 2003
F. K. Bebli	September 2003 – March 2010
Francis Ahiafor	March 2010 – 2013
James Dapaah Asamoah	2013–2016
Cyril Kwadzo Dadey	January 2016 – August 2018
Paul Amoasi Baidoo	November 2018 - November 2024
Rev. Fr. Dr. George Obeng Appah	December 2024 to Date

== See also ==
- Roman Catholicism in Ghana
- Education in Ghana
- List of senior high schools in Ghana
