= James Horstead =

James Lawrence Cecil Horstead CMG, CBE (16 February 1898 – 9 June 1989) was an Anglican bishop of Sierra Leone who later became Archbishop of West Africa.

He was educated at Christ's Hospital and (after World War I service) Durham University. Horstead was President of the Durham Union for Easter term of 1921. He was ordained in 1924 and began his career with a curacy at St Margaret's Church, Durham. Emigrating to Africa he was Principal of Fourah Bay College until 1936 when he was elevated to the episcopate. In 1955 he became the Province's Primate, retiring in 1961. He was Rector of Appleby Magna until 1968 and an Assistant Bishop in the Diocese of Leicester until 1976.

Religious titles
Preceded by George William Wright	Bishop of Sierra Leone; 1936 – 1961	Succeeded by Moses Scott
Preceded by Leslie Gordon Vining	Archbishop of West Africa; 1955 – 1961	Succeeded by Cecil John Patterson
