= Dibo =

Dibo may refer to:

== People ==
- Dibo Johnson (1890–1940), American baseball player
- Dibo Thomas-Babyngton Elango
- Sob Evariste Dibo (born 1968), Ivorian football player
- Will Dibo, Austrian athlete

== Places ==
- Termessadou-Dibo, Guinea

== Other ==
- Dibo language
- Dibo people
