= Jonathan Hart (bishop) =

Liberian Episcopalian bishop (born 1953)

The Most Reverend Jonathan Hart
- Archbishop of West Africa, Bishop of Liberia
- Church: Church of the Province of West Africa
- Diocese: Episcopal Diocese of Liberia
- Predecessor: Daniel Sarfo

Orders
- Consecration: 2008 by Justice Akrofi
- Rank: Archbishop

Personal details
- Born: 9 January 1953 (age 73) Crozierville, Montserrado County

Jonathan Bau-Bau Bonaparte Hart (born Crozierville, Montserrado County, 9 January 1953) is a Liberian Episcopalian bishop. He has been Archbishop and Primate of the Church of the Province of West Africa since 3 March 2019.

== Biography ==
Hart graduated at the Cuttington University in Liberia. He later studied also at the Episcopal Divinity School, in Cambridge, United States, where he took a Master of Divinity degree.

He has been bishop of the Episcopal Diocese of Liberia since 2 March 2008. He was elected by the Electoral College of the Internal Province of West Africa of the Church of the Province of West Africa on 1 March 2014, to be the new archbishop, replacing Solomon Tilewa Johnson of Gambia, who had died suddenly shortly before. He was enthroned at the Cathedral Church of the Holy Trinity, in Monrovia, at 6 July 2014.

He was enthroned as the Primate and Archbishop of the Church of the Province of West Africa at the Cathedral Church of the Holy Trinity, in Monrovia, on 3 March 2019.

He attended the 7th Global South Conference, held in Cairo, Egypt, on 11–12 October 2019.

Anglican Communion titles
Preceded by Daniel Sarfo	Primate of the Church of the Province of West Africa; 2019–2022	Succeeded by Cyril Kobina Ben-Smith
