= Holy Trinity Cathedral (Accra) =

Anglican Church in Accra

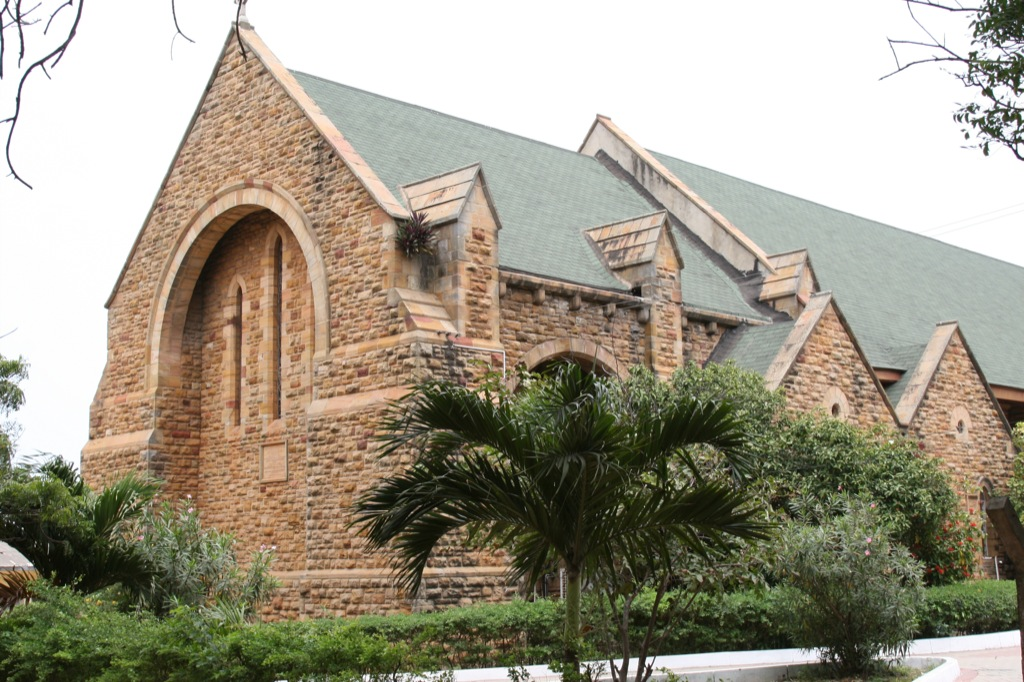
- Holy Trinity Cathedral
- 5.5415°N 0.2061°W
- Location: High Street, Accra
- Country: Ghana
- Denomination: Anglican

History
- Founded: 1894; 132 years ago

Architecture
- Architect: Aston Webb
- Style: Brick Romanesque
- Completed: 1894; 132 years ago

The Holy Trinity Cathedral, officially known as Cathedral Church of the Most Holy Trinity is an Anglican church in Accra, Ghana. Completed in 1894, it is part of the Anglican Diocese of Accra in the Church of the Province of West Africa.

== History ==
The funding for the Cathedral came from the colonial British government and was initially patronized by colonial expatriates. It was designed by Aston Webb. In 1909, the building was deemed a cathedral upon the creation of the Diocese of Accra.

== Gallery ==
Postcard photo of Trinity Church, c. 1905. Basel Mission Book Depot no. 28

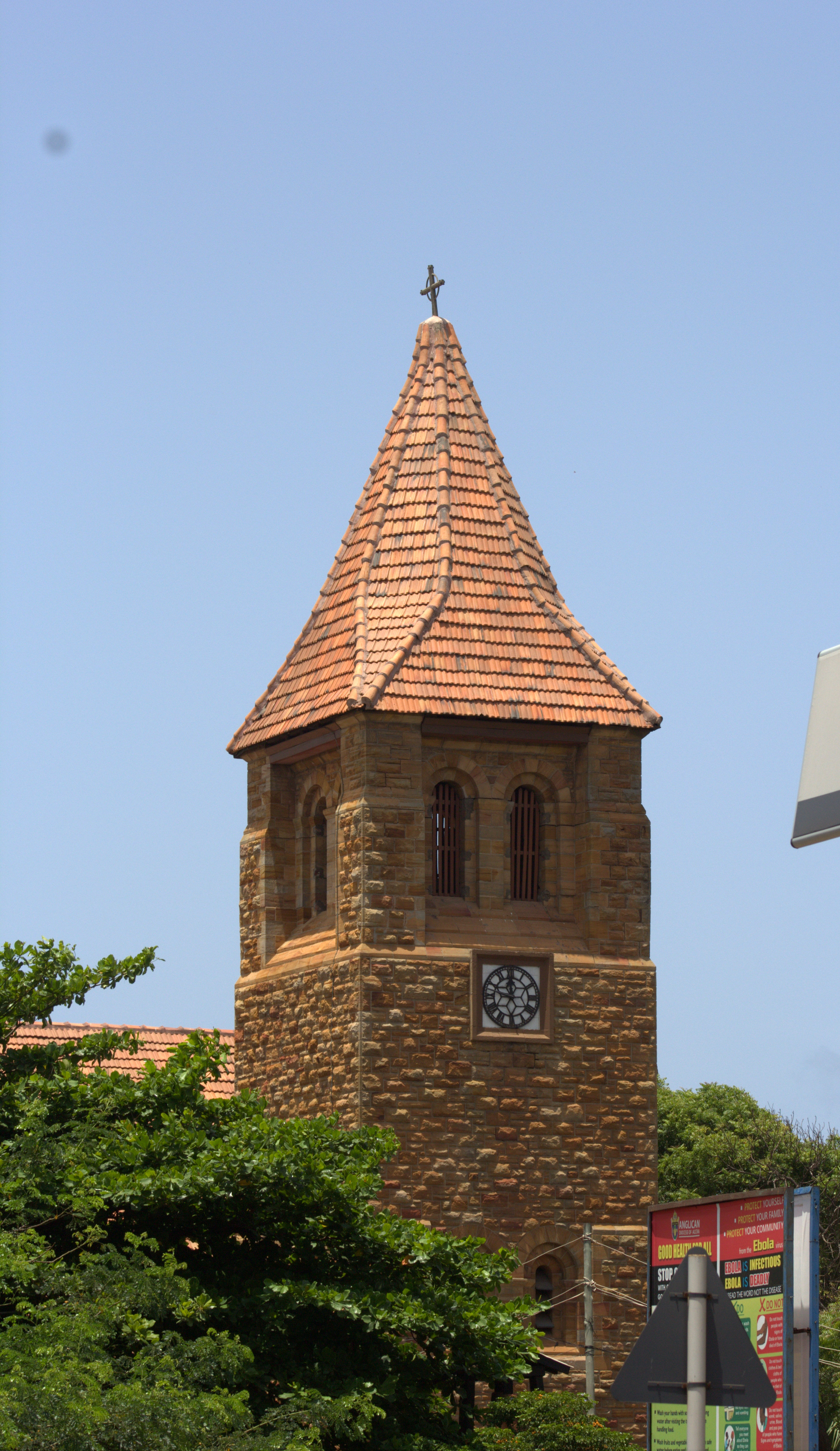
Holy Trinity Cathedral tower
