= John Payne (bishop of Liberia) =

Missionary Bishop from the Episcopal Church to Liberia

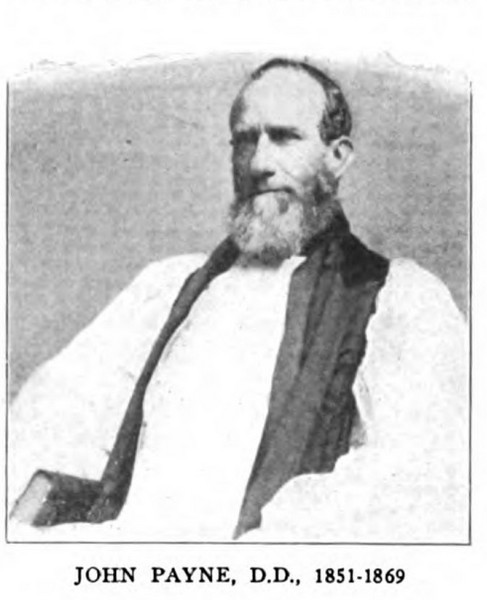
- Title: Bishop of Liberia

Personal life
- Born: January 9, 1815 Westmoreland County, Virginia, US
- Died: 23 October 1874 (aged 59) Westmoreland County, Virginia, US
- Resting place: Virginia Theological Seminary
- Education: Virginia Theological Seminary, College of William & Mary

Religious life
- Religion: Episcopalian
- Profession: missionary
- Ordination: 1841
- Consecration: July 11, 1851

Senior posting
- Successor: John Gottlieb Auer

John Payne (January 9, 1815 – October 23, 1874) was a Missionary Bishop from the Episcopal Church to Liberia, and the first bishop of the Episcopal Diocese of Liberia.

== Early life ==
Payne was born in 1815 in Westmoreland County, Virginia. He was the son of John Payne and Francis (Morris) Payne, both of Virginia. He graduated from the College of William and Mary in 1833 and from the Virginia Theological Seminary in 1836. Following his graduation, Payne was ordained deacon on July 17, 1836 at Christ Church in Alexandria, Virginia. He married Anna Matilda Barroll in 1837, and they both spent the next five years as missionaries in West Africa, primarily serving the colony of formerly enslaved African-Americans living around Cape Palmas. Payne returned in 1841 to be ordained priest.

== Missionary bishop ==
On July 11, 1851, Payne was consecrated Bishop of Cape Palmas and Parts Adjacent in West Africa. He was the 52nd bishop in the ECUSA, and was consecrated by Bishops William Meade, Alfred Lee, and John Johns. He spent the next twenty years in Liberia, before returning to the United States in ill health in 1871. During Payne's tenure, the Episcopal Church built five churches, two asylums, and a hospital, and ordained twenty priests. As an outgrowth of Payne's suggestion that a theology school be built in Liberia, the Liberian legislature incorporated Liberia College in 1851. During his time as bishop, Payne's wife died and he remarried, in 1858, to Martha Jane Williford of Georgia, another missionary.

He returned to the United States in ill health for the 1871 General Convention, and the House of Bishops accepted his resignation. His successor, John Gottlieb Auer, was duly consecrated and traveled to Cape Palmas, but the same record of the 1874 General Convention that memorialized Bishop Payne's death in 1874 also marked Bishop Auer's consecration in 1873 and death in Cape Palmas the following February.

== Death and legacy ==
Bishop Payne had the home he constructed after his first wife Anna's death, "Cavalla," dismantled, shipped to, and rebuilt in his native Westmoreland County, where he died. His grave was moved to the Virginia Theological Seminary (VTS) graveyard when it was constructed shortly thereafter, after the death of bishop John Johns, another distinguished alumnus.

In 1878, a divinity school was established in Petersburg, Virginia to train African Americans as Episcopalian clerics, and upon its chartering by the Commonwealth in 1884, named after the late bishop. The school was ultimately merged with VTS, with which it had always maintained an affiliation. Its buildings in Petersburg closed in 1949, although now commemorated with a state historical marker. The VTS library is also now named in Bishop Payne's honor, and a section of its archives specializes in the history of African Americans in the Episcopal Church.
