= Daniel Torto =

Ghanaian Anglican bishop (born 1960)

The Right Reverend Daniel Sylvanus Mensah Torto
- Bishop of Accra
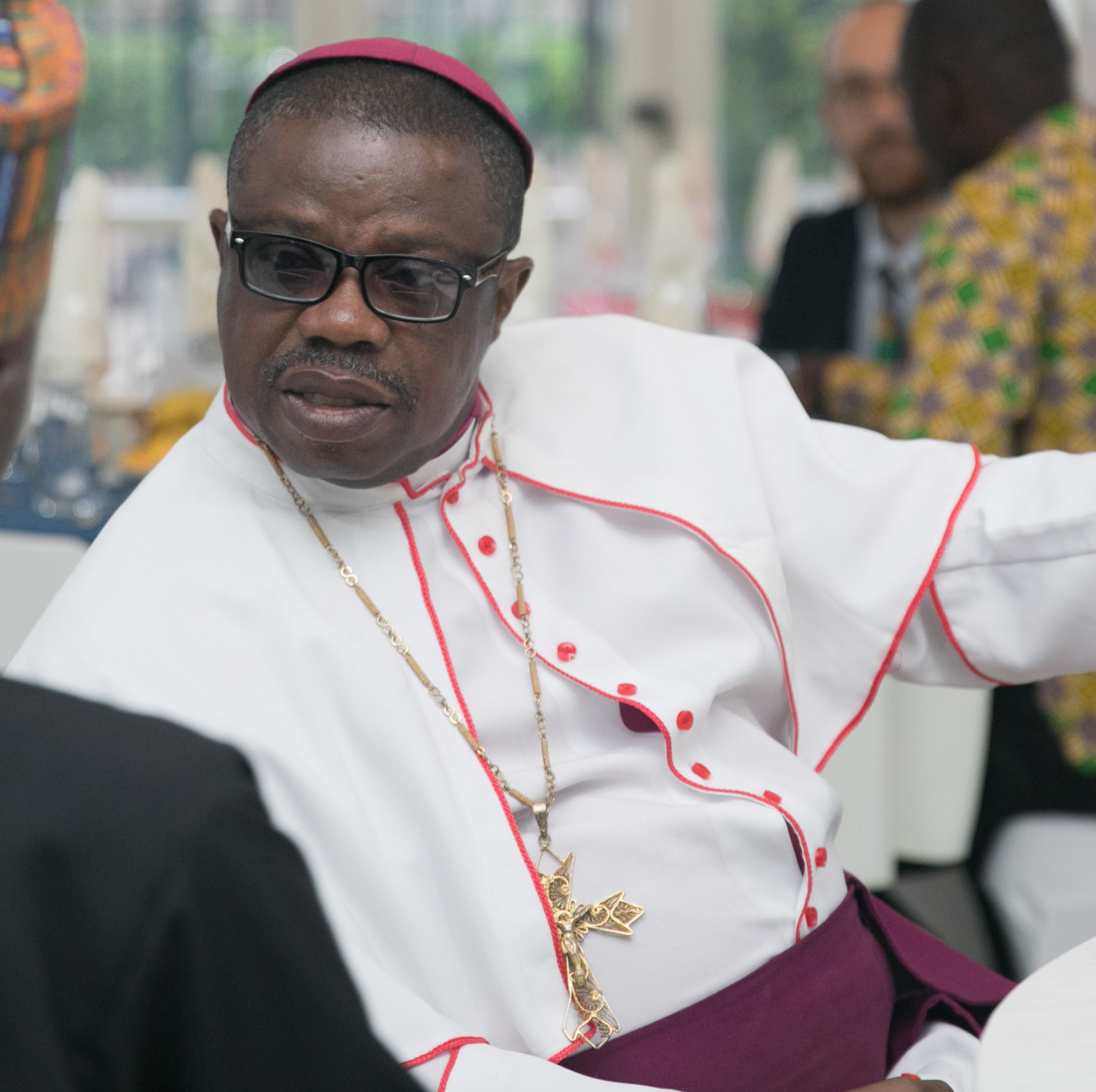
- Bishop Torto in 2019
- Church: Church of the Province of West Africa
- Diocese: Accra
- Predecessor: Justice Akrofi

Orders
- Consecration: 2012

Daniel Sylvanus Mensah Torto (born 1960) is a Ghanaian Anglican bishop. He has been the Anglican Bishop of Accra, in the Church of the Province of West Africa, since 2012.

== Education ==
Torto was educated at St. Thomas Aquinas Senior High School, the University of Ghana, Episcopal Divinity School and Vision International University.

== Ministry ==
His ministry has seen him serve at Mamprobi, Accra, Osu and Adabraka.

== Senior posts ==
Immediately before becoming bishop, he was chairman of the Accra East Archdeaconry and General Secretary of the Ghana Anglican Clergy Association.

== Personal life ==
He is married to Gladys and they have four children.

Anglican Communion titles
Preceded by Justice Akrofi	Bishop of Accra; 2003–2012	Succeeded by Incumbent
