= Lord Oblitey Commey =

Ghanaian politician and administrator

- President: Nana Akuffo-Addo

Personal details
- Born: Ghana
- Party: New Patriotic Party

Lord Oblitey Commey is a Ghanaian administrator, entrepreneur and politician. He is a member of the New Patriotic Party and was director of operations at the Jubilee House, the official residence and office of the president of Ghana under the New Patriotic Party government of Nana Akufo-Addo. He has served as an executive member of Accra Hearts of Oak Sporting Club and is a former youth organizer for the New Patriotic Party.

== Early life and education ==
Lord Commey was born in 1969 in Accra. He attended St. Thomas Aquinas Senior High School.He was awarded honorary master's degree by the New London Graduate School and an honorary doctorate degree in public administration, Honoris causa by the Commonwealth University in 2017.

== Working life ==
For several years in the early 2000s, Lord Commey served as an executive member of the board of Accra Hearts of Oak Sporting Club. He continues to take interest in football development in the country. He helped organize Rumbe@60 - the 60th Independence Football match between Accra Hearts of Oak and Kumasi Asante Kotoko football club. He was a member of the Ghana@60 planning committee which was tasked with planning and holding celebratory events to mark 60 years if Ghana's independence.

== Political life ==
Lord Commey was the National Youth Organizer of the New Patriotic Party from 1999 to 2003. Lord Commey was appointed the operations director for the Nana Akufo-Addo campaign prior to the 2012 Ghanaian general election. It was after his appointment that members of the opposition National Democratic Congress accused him of engaging in acts that cause confusion at political rallies through the use of thugs. He has spoken on several national issues including distancing the NPP from comments made by Haruna Esseku, a former party chairman. Esseku had claimed that the 1966 Coup d'état that ousted the Kwame Nkrumah administration had restored multiparty democracy to Ghana. Lord Commey refuted the claim and stated that the New Patriotic Party had never and will never support the idea of coup d'état whether in Ghana or elsewhere.

In January 2017 he was appointed by President Nana Akuffo-Addo as director of operations at the presidential palace, The Flagstaff House. His appointment was hailed by many New Patriotic Party members who believed that due to his constant engagement with the grassroots supporters, he would be a conduit between them and the president. Some also believed that he was being rewarded for all the work he did to ensure that the party won the 2016 Ghanaian general election. In June 2017, he denied rumors of his having been fired, which he had not been.

Lord Commey ceased to be Director of Operations with the defeat of the NPP in the 2024 Ghanaian general election. Under the following government, Nathan Kofi Baokye became Director of Operations at Julibee House

== Personal life ==
Oblitey Commey is married with three daughters.

Political offices
Preceded by	Director of Operations; Ghana; 2017 - 2021; 2021 -	Incumbent
