= Jacob Kofi Ayeebo =

Ghanaian Anglican bishop (1960–2019)

Jacob Kofi Ayeebo (1960–2019) was an Anglican bishop in Ghana. He was the Bishop of Tamale and died in 2019.
