= Timothy F. Sedgwick =

American philosopher

- Born: Timothy Foster Sedgwick; 1947 (age 78–79)
- Spouse: Martha W. Sedgwick

Academic background
- Education: Albion College; Vanderbilt University
- Thesis: History, Faith and the Moral Life (1975)

Academic work
- Discipline: Philosophy
- Sub-discipline: Ethics
- School or tradition: Anglicanism
- Institutions: Denison University; Marshall University; Blackburn College; Seabury-Western Theological Seminary; Virginia Theological Seminary

Timothy Foster Sedgwick (born 1947) is an American Episcopal ethicist. In addition to being the Clinton S. Quin Professor of Christian Ethics at Virginia Theological Seminary, he has served since 2007 as Vice President and Associate Dean of Academic Affairs.

Sedgwick received his AB from Albion College and his MA and PhD from Vanderbilt University. Following his doctorate he taught undergraduates at Denison University, Marshall University, and Blackburn College and then for 19 years taught Christian ethics at Seabury-Western Theological Seminary.

He has served the Anglican Theological Review as book review editor, board member, and president of the board and as a member of the board of directors for the Society of Christian Ethics. In the Episcopal Church he serves on the Advisory Board for the College for Bishops and on the Anglican–Roman Catholic Theological Consultation in the USA (ARC-USA) bilateral discussion, which recently completed a six-year study on moral theology. Previously he served on the Task Force on End-of-Life Issues, the Task Force on Ethics and the New Genetics, the Committee on Sexual Exploitation, the delegation to the governing Board of the National Council of Churches in Christ, the General Board of Examining Chaplains, the Council for the Development of Ministry (where he served as vice-chairperson), the Total Ministry Task Force, and the Task Force on Lay Professionals.

Sedgwick is married to Martha W. Sedgwick and has two grown daughters.

== Books published ==
- Sedgwick, Timothy F. (1982). Abortion: Morality and the Law. Cincinnati, Ohio: Forward Movement Publications. OCLC 18725374.
- Sedgwick, Timothy F. (1987). Sacramental Ethics: Paschal Identity and the Christian Life. Philadelphia, Pennsylvania: Fortress Press. ISBN 978-0800619657.
- Sedgwick, Timothy F. (1991). Dealing with Conflict in Councils and Conventions of the Church: How the System Works, How It Might Be Improved. Cincinnati, Ohio: Forward Movement Publications. OCLC 23965744.
- Sedgwick, Timothy F.; Turner, Philip, eds. (1992). The Crisis in Moral Teaching in the Episcopal Church. Harrisburg, Pennsylvania: Morehouse Publishers. ISBN 978-0819215925.
- Sedgwick, Timothy F. (1993). The Making of Ministry. Cambridge, Massachusetts: Cowley. ISBN 978-1561010820.
- Sedgwick, Timothy F. (1999). The Christian Moral Life: Practices of Piety. New York: Seabury Books. ISBN 978-1596271005.
- End of Life Task Force (2000). Cohen, Cynthia B.; Sedgwick, Timothy F.; et al. (eds.). Faithful Living, Faithful Dying: Anglican Reflections on End of Life Care. Harrisburg, Pennsylvania: Morehouse Publishing. ISBN 978-0819218308.
- Sedgwick, Timothy F.; Schlafer, David J. (2007). Preaching What We Practice: Proclamation and Moral Discernment. Harrisburg, Pennsylvania: Morehouse Publishing. ISBN 978-0819222183.
- Sedgwick, Timothy F. (2014). Sex, Moral Teaching, and the Unity of the Church: A Study of the Episcopal Church. Nashville, Tennessee: Abingdon. ISBN 978-0819229663.

== See also ==
- List of Virginia Theological Seminary people
