= John Otoo =

Anglican bishop in Ghana

John Otoo is an Anglican bishop in Ghana: he has been Bishop of Sekondi from 2006 to 2016.
