= Lloyd A. Lewis =

American theologian

The Reverend Lloyd Alexander "Tony" Lewis, Jr. served on the faculty of Virginia Theological Seminary from 1978 through 1991 and from 2000 to his retirement in 2012. He was the Molly Laird Downs Professor of the New Testament.

== Early life ==
He completed his Ph.D. at Yale University in New Haven, Connecticut, where the focus of his study was on the social and theological implications of the use of family language in Paul's Letter to Philemon. He previously received the M.A. and M.Phil. in New Testament studies at Yale University, the M.Div. from Virginia Theological Seminary, Alexandria, Virginia, and an A.B. in Classics from Trinity College, Hartford, Connecticut. Virginia Theological Seminary has conferred upon him the D.D. honoris causae.

== Career ==
Before joining the Faculty at VTS, Professor Lewis was ordained a deacon and priest in The Episcopal Church. He was Curate at Saint George's Church, Brooklyn, Assistant at Saint Monica's Church, Hartford, and Tutor at The General Theological Seminary, New York City. Prior to his return to the Faculty he was Dean of the George Mercer, Jr. Memorial School of Theology and Bishop's Deputy for Education in the Episcopal Diocese of Long Island, Honorary Assistant at the Church of Saint James of Jerusalem, Long Beach, New York, and Adjunct in New Testament at the General Theological Seminary, New York City.

Professor Lewis is a Canon Theologian to the bishops of Long Island and an Honorary Assistant to the Rectors of Rectors of Saint Paul's Parish, Washington, DC, Christ Church, Hackensack, New Jersey and Trinity Episcopal Church, St. Mary's City, Maryland.

== See also ==
- List of Virginia Theological Seminary people
