= Ishmael Mills Le-Maire =

Ghanaian Anglican vicar

Ishmael Samuel Mills Le-Maire (August 29, 1912 – 1984) was the first Ghanaian Bishop of Accra from 1968 to 1982.

Ordained in 1936, he was Canon of Accra and Archdeacon of Sekondi from 1960 until 1963 when he was elevated to the episcopate as an assistant bishop.

He was Archbishop of the Church of the Province of West Africa from 1981 to 1982.

Anglican Communion titles
Preceded by Richard Roseveare	Bishop of Accra; 1968–1982	Succeeded by Francis Thompson
Preceded by Moses Scott, Bishop of Sierra Leone	Archbishop of West Africa; 1981–1982	Succeeded by George Browne, Bishop of Liberia
