= St. George's Cathedral, Freetown =

Church in Freetown, Sierra Leone

Coordinates: 8.4900°N 13.2356°W

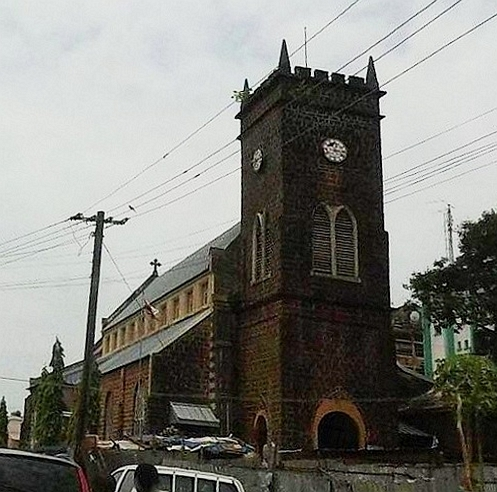
St. George's Cathedral, Freetown

St. George's Cathedral is an historical Church Mission Society Anglican church in Freetown, Sierra Leone. The church was one of the grandest churches in Freetown, and had one of the highest attendance ratings for a church. It is now the Cathedral Church of the Anglican Diocese of Freetown. As an iconic edifice strongly associated with the Creole people of Sierra Leone, St George's Cathedral was described as "that bastion of Creoledom."

Building begun in 1817, and was completed in 1828.
