= Felix Odei Annancy =

Ghanaian bishop

Felix Odei Annancy is an Anglican bishop and the current Bishop of Koforidua in Ghana. Koforidua is a diocese in the Church of the Province of West Africa.

Annancy was ordained in 1988. He served in Akosombo, Akuse, Nsawam and Kibi. He was Dean of Anglican Diocese of Koforidua before his consecration as bishop in 2017. Annancy has spoken publicly against corruption in Ghanaian society. He attended the Fifteenth Lambeth Conference of the Anglican Communion in 2022.
