= Anglican Diocese of Cape Coast =

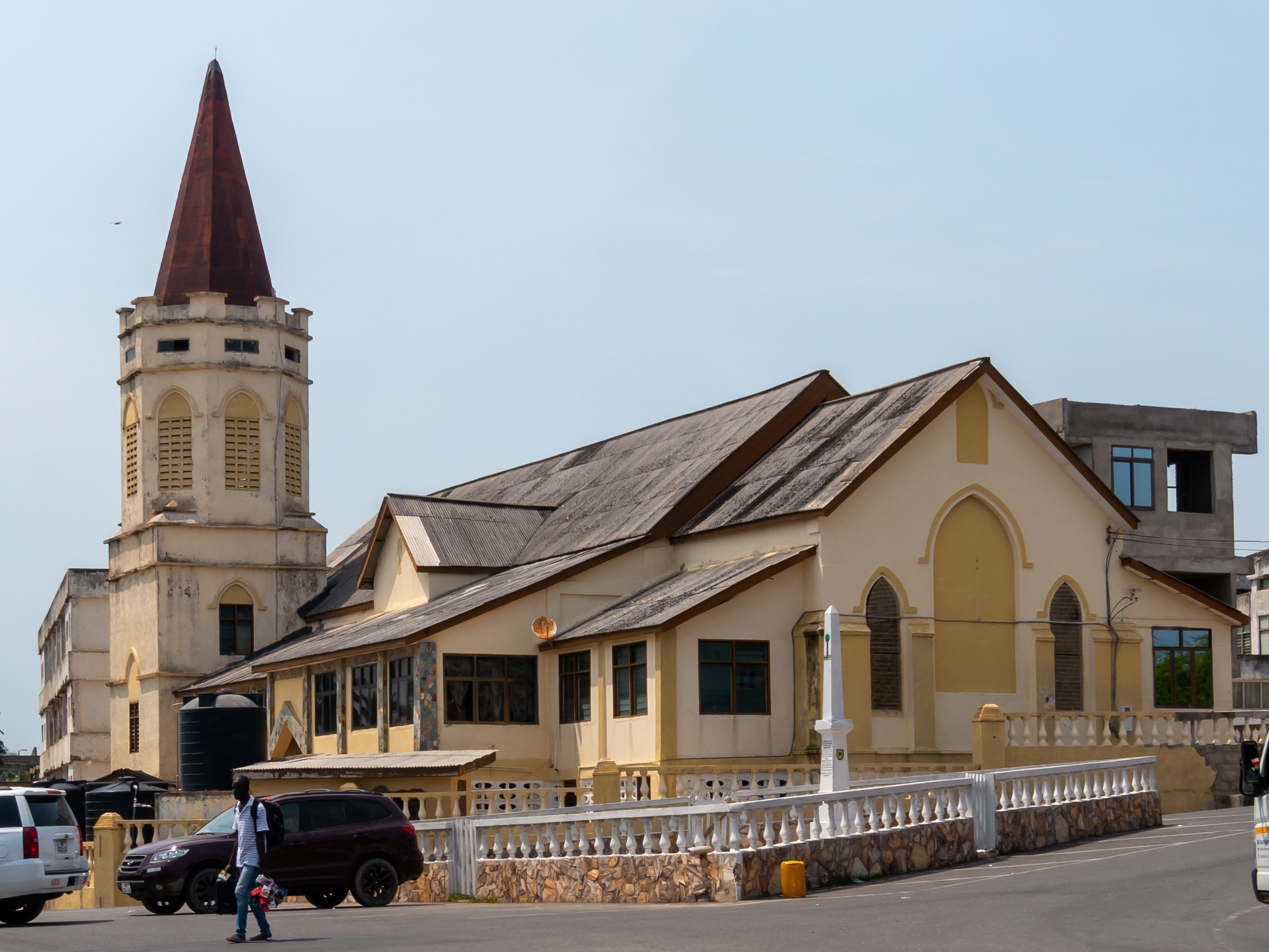
Christ Church Cathedral in Cape Coast

The Anglican Diocese of Cape Coast is a Diocese of the Church of the Province of West Africa, a member church of the worldwide Anglican Communion. It is the oldest area of Anglican missionary activity in Ghana. This diocese was created from the then Accra Diocese in 1981. It has had four Diocesan Bishops to date. They are the Rt Rev John Alexander Ackon, Rt Rev Eduah Quarshie, Rt Rev Daniel Sylvanus Adotei Allotey and the current Diocesan, Rt Rev Victor Reginald Atta-Baffoe. She is divided into 5 Archdeaconries: Winneba, Saltpond, Cape Coast, Fosu and Agona-Swedru, and the Cathedral Parish of Christ the King. The current Dean of Christ the King Cathedral is Very Rev. Fr. Peter Amoako-Gyampah, with Venerable Samuel Ato Mbrah-Ghartey as the Precentor. Venerable Aaron Moses Eduah, Archdeacon of Winneba. Venerable Samuel Kojo Baisie, Archdeacon of Fosu. Venerable Joseph Sam, Archdeacon of Cape Coast. Venerable James Bernard Aikins, Archdeacon of Saltpond and the Newly Inducted Archdeacon of Agona-Swedru, Venerable Stanislaus Kojo Eshun. In 2014, the Diocese of Dunkwa-on-Offin was carved out of the Diocese of Cape Coast, making it one of two in the Central Region of Ghana. She has an active church membership of around 14,687 worshipping in 54 Parishes and their outstations. She also has about 49 active duty Clergy, including three female Priests, and three Deacons, Namely Rev. Jeremiah Nii Nartey, Rev. Lawrence Owusu and Rev. Albert Cobbah. In 2020 the Anglican Diocese of Cape Coast ordained its first female deacon, the Rev Mrs Vida Gyabeng Frimpong. The Administrator of the Diocese is Rev. Fr. Domenick Eshun, a native of Elmina. He is also the current Bishop Ackon Memorial Eye Center Chaplain in Cape Coast. He is also the Priest In Charge of the Good Shepherd Anglican Church, Eguase.

On June 28, 2025, the Anglican Diocese of Cape Coast ordained Fr. Jeremiah Nii Nartey into the Priesthood. Additionally, the following were ordained into the Sacred Order of Deacons: Rev. Jonas Opoku Amankwah, Rev. Christian Kwesi Ekwam, Rev. Frederick Abanyin, Rev. Stephen Sosu, and Rev. Janet Yamoah.

Its partner diocese is the Diocese of Chichester. The current bishop is Victor Atta-Baffoe.

== Education ==
The role of the Diocese in the development of education in the Central Region cannot be over-emphasized. There are 54 Day Nurseries, 62 Primary Schools and 74 Junior Secondary Schools under the administration of the Anglican Educational Unit. There are two Senior High Schools in the Diocese. These include the world-famous boys boarding Senior High School, and Adisadel College. The other Senior High School is the mixed Christ the King Academy. The Church of the Province of West Africa's Provincial Seminary, St Nicholas Seminary is located in Cape Coast in the Diocese. She also has the oldest school in Ghana. The Philip Quaque Boys School was founded by the now canonised Rev Philip Quaque, an SPG missionary of local origins, in the 18th century.

== Healthcare ==
With regard to the provision of health care the Diocese has two medical facilities: a health clinic at Dominase in the Upper Denkyira District and an Eye Clinic, the Bishop Ackon Memorial Christian Eye Centre in Cape Coast.
