= Anglican Diocese of Cameroon =

The Anglican Diocese of Cameroon is a diocese of the Church of the Province of West Africa, a member church of the worldwide Anglican Communion. Its partner diocese is the Diocese of Chichester. It was created in 2008 and its current bishop is Dibo Thomas-Babyngton Elango.
