= Roderic Coote =

- Bishop of Colchester
- Diocese: Diocese of Chelmsford
- In office: 1966–1987 (ret.)
- Predecessor: Frederick Narborough
- Successor: Michael Vickers
- Other posts: Bishop of Gambia and the Rio Pongas (1951–1957); Bishop of Fulham (1957–1966)

Orders
- Ordination: 1939
- Consecration: 1951

Personal details
- Born: 13 April 1915
- Died: 6 July 2000 (aged 85)
- Denomination: Anglican
- Education: Trinity College, Dublin

Roderic Norman Coote OBE (13 April 1915 – 6 July 2000) was an Anglican bishop who held three different posts in an ecclesiastical career spanning half a century.

Coote was the son of Commander Bernard Trotter Coote and Grace Harriet Robinson, daughter of the Very Reverend John Joseph Robinson. He was the grandson of Sir Algernon Coote, 12th Baronet, Lord-Lieutenant of Queen's County (see Coote baronets). Educated at Trinity College, Dublin and ordained in 1939, he began his career with a curacy at St Bartholomew's, Dublin. After a decade as a missionary priest in The Gambia he became diocesan bishop (Bishop of Gambia and the Rio Pongas) in 1951. Translated to Fulham in 1957, his final appointment was a sideways move to Bishop of Colchester nine years later. He became an area bishop with the creation of the Chelmsford area scheme 1983. An accomplished musician, he died just six months short of his 50th Episcopal anniversary.

Coote married Erica Lynette Shrubbs, daughter of Reverend Eric Gordon Shrubbs, in 1964. They had one son and two daughters. He died in July 2000, aged 85.

Church of England titles
Preceded by John Daly	Bishop of Gambia and the Rio Pongas; 1951 – 1957	Succeeded by St John Pike
Preceded by Robert Stopford	Bishop of Fulham; 1957 – 1966	Succeeded by Alan Rogers
Preceded by Frederick Narborough	Bishop of Colchester; 1966 – 1987	Succeeded by Michael Vickers
