= Ezra Martinson =

British clergyman

Ezra Douglas Martinson (1885–1968) MBE was an Anglican bishop in Africa in the third quarter of the 20th century.

== Education ==
Martinson was educated at King's College London.

== Career summary ==
- ordained deacon, 1915
- ordained priest, 1916
- Priest Diocese of Accra, 1915–1937
- Archdeacon of Sedonki
- Archdeacon of Kumasi
- Assistant Bishop of Accra, 1951–1963

== Honours ==
Martinson was awarded the MBE for services to education in 1943.
