= St John Pike =

St John Surridge Pike (27 December 1909 – 13 November 1992) was an Anglican bishop in the third quarter of the twentieth century.

Educated at Trinity College, Dublin and ordained in 1934, he began his career with a curacy at Taney. After this he was Head of the Southern Church Mission, Ballymacarrett then Rector of St George’s, Belfast. In 1958 he was elevated to the episcopate as Bishop of Gambia and the Rio Pongas. On his return from Africa he became an Assistant Bishop of Guildford and held incumbencies at Ewshot (until 1971) and at Botleys with Lyne and Long Cross (from 1971) until his retirement (as Vicar and as Assistant Bishop) on 26 November 1983.

Church of England titles
Preceded by Roderic Norman Coote	Bishop of Gambia and the Rio Pongas; 1958 – 1963	Succeeded by Timothy Omotayo Olufosoye
