= Anglican Diocese of Sekondi =

The Anglican Diocese of Sekondi is a Ghanaian diocese of the Church of the Province of West Africa, a member church of the worldwide Anglican Communion. The current bishop is Alexander Kobina Asmah since 2016.
