= Thomas Arnold Ikunika Wilson =

Thomas Arnold Ikunika Wilson is an Anglican bishop and scholar in Sierra Leone: he is the current Bishop of Freetown.
