= A. Katherine Grieb =

American theologian and New Testament professor

- Born: Anne Katherine Grieb; June 3, 1949 (age 77); Easton, Maryland, U.S.
- Education: Hollins University (BA); Catholic University of America (JD); Virginia Theological Seminary (M.Div.); Yale University (Ph.D.)
- Occupations: biblical scholar, Episcopal priest

Anne Katherine Grieb (born June 3, 1949) is an American biblical scholar and Episcopal priest. She has taught New Testament at Virginia Theological Seminary since 1994, and is currently Meade Professor in Biblical Interpretation. She previously taught at Bangor Theological Seminary in Maine.

She has a B.A. in Philosophy and Religion from Hollins University and a J.D. from Columbus School of Law at the Catholic University of America. She has also earned a M.Div. from Virginia Theological Seminary and has a Ph.D. in Religious Studies from Yale University. Ordained to the diaconate and priesthood in the Episcopal Diocese of Washington in 1983.

== Bibliography ==
- The Story of Romans: A Narrative Defense of God's Righteousness. Westminster John Knox Press. 2002. ISBN 0-664-22525-X.
- To Set Our Hope on Christ: A Response to the Invitation of Windsor Report Paragraph 135, (The Office of Communication, the Episcopal Church Center, New York, 2005)
- Conversations with Scripture: Hebrews. Morehouse Publishing. 2007. ISBN 978-0-8192-2223-7.

== See also ==
- List of Virginia Theological Seminary people
