= Richard Roseveare =

Reginald Richard Roseveare SSM CBE (18 May 1902 – 9 April 1972) was an Anglican bishop in Africa in the third quarter of the 20th century.

Educated at Sedbergh School, Roseveare was ordained in 1930 and began his career with a curacy at St George, Nottingham. He was a Tutor at Kelham Theological College from 1934 to 37 then Priest in charge of the Mission District of Parson Cross, Sheffield then the area's Vicar. After this he was a Canon Residentiary at Sheffield Cathedral until his appointment to the episcopate as Bishop of Accra. He was expelled in 1962, resigned in 1967 and died on 9 April 1973.

Church of England titles
Preceded by John Daly	Bishop of Accra; 1956–1967	Succeeded by Ishmael Mills Le-Maire
