= Anglican Diocese of Asante Mampong =

Diocese of Asante Mampong

The Anglican Diocese of Asante Mampong (ADAM) was inaugurated on 23 November 2014 by Daniel Yinkah Sarfo, Archbishop and Primate of the Church of the Province of West Africa (CPWA). The first Diocesan Bishop of Asante Mampong is Cyril Kobina Ben-Smith. The new Diocese covers a remote rural and forest area of the Ashanti region.

== Province and Parishes ==
Asante Mampong is the 17th Diocese within the Church of the Province of West Africa, 11 of which are in the internal Province of Ghana. The mother church of the Diocese is the Cathedral Church of St Michael and All Angels in Mampong and there are currently parishes established at Kumawu (St Peter), Ejura (St Mary's ), Kwamang (St Andrew), Nsuta (St Joseph), Juaben (St Paul), Odumasi (St Peter), Daaho (St John), Kyiremfaso (St Paul), Abonkoso (St Thomas), Konongo (St Barnabas), Bonkro (St Augustine), Jamasi (St Nicholas sub-parish) and Dromankoma (Christ the King). Five more communities are preparing to receive parochial status: Effiduasi (St Mark), Woraso (St Mary), Agogo Anglican Community, Nobewam (St Anthony) and Kofiase/Benim Anglican Community. There is a larger number of small rural stations.

=== The Cathedral ===
Raised to cathedral status in 2014, the Cathedral Church of St Michael and All Angels, Mampong, is the centre of mission for the Diocese. The Dean is Ven Bismark Opoku Acheampong and Acting Canon Precentor, Balthazar Obeng Larbi who is also Registrar of the Diocese.
