= Anglican Diocese of Ho =

The Anglican Diocese of Ho is a Ghanaian diocese of the Church of the Province of West Africa, a member church of the worldwide Anglican Communion. The current bishop is Matthias Mededues-Badohu.
