= Leopold Kroll =

American bishop (1874–1946)

Leopold Kroll (December 26, 1874 – March 5, 1946) was a missionary bishop of the Missionary District of Liberia. After studies at the General Theological Seminary, he was ordained deacon and priest in 1900. He was consecrated bishop on February 20, 1936, and served in Liberia until 1945. He died in Salisbury, North Carolina.
