= Daniel Sarfo =

Ghanaian Anglican bishop

The Most Reverend Daniel Sarfo
- Archbishop of West Africa, Bishop of Kumasi
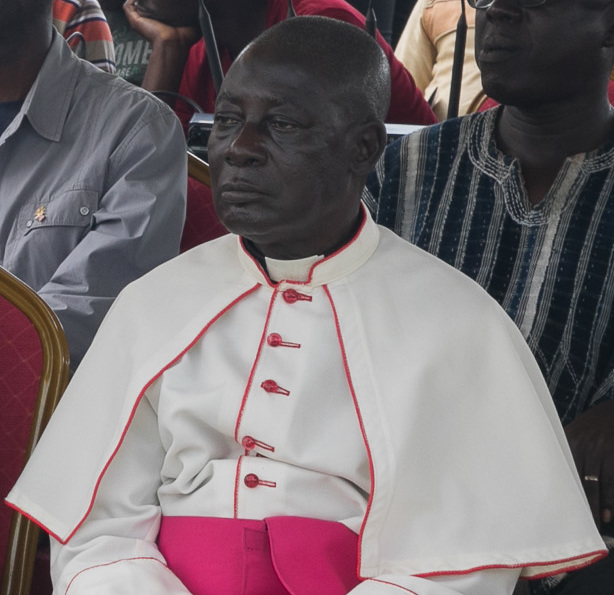
- Church: Church of the Province of West Africa
- Predecessor: Solomon Tilewa Johnson

Orders
- Ordination: 1979 (deacon); 1980 (priest)
- Consecration: 1999 by Robert Okine
- Rank: Archbishop

Daniel Yinkah Sarfo is a Ghanaian Anglican bishop. He has been a metropolitan archbishop since September 2012, and was Archbishop Primate of the Church of the Province of West Africa (CPWA), since 13 March 2014 until 3 March 2019.

== Education ==
He studied for the ministry at Trinity Theological Seminary, in Accra, Ghana. He moved to the United Kingdom, where he received a MA degree in Mission Studies at the University of Leeds, and a Doctorate in Theology at the University of Wales, in Lampeter.

== Ecclesiastical career ==
He was ordained as a deacon on 26 August 1979, and as a priest on 14 September 1980. He was a parish priest until his appointment to be archdeacon of Sunyani in 1986, and became a canon of Kumasi cathedral in 1994. He was a forces chaplain in the Ghanaian Army, holding the rank of major when he was elected the third bishop of the Diocese of Kumasi on 20 November 1998. He was consecrated on 14 March 1999. Sarfo was elected the first Metropolitan archbishop of the Internal Province of Ghana on its creation on 29 September 2012. He automatically succeeded Solomon Tilewa Johnson, after his unexpected death, as Archbishop Primate of CPWA, by virtue of being the surviving metropolitan (according to the 2012 adaptation of the CPWA constitution). He was consecrated the 10th Primate of the Church of the Province of West Africa on 13 March 2014.

== Beliefs ==
Unlike his two predecessors, he is seen as a supporter of reconciliation between the liberal and conservative wings of the Anglican Communion. He still attended the 3rd Provincial Assembly of the Anglican Church in North America, in Wheaton, Illinois, in June 2017. He also attended the Global South meeting, in 8–9 September 2017, in Cairo, Egypt, and was one of the signants of their communiqué, with nine other Anglican Primates, including Foley Beach, from the Anglican Church in North America.

Anglican Communion titles
Preceded by Solomon Tilewa Johnson	Primate of the Church of the Province of West Africa; 2014–2019	Succeeded by Jonathan Hart
