= James Allen Yaw Odico =

Bishop of Gambia (1952 - 2025)

The Right Reverend James Allen Yaw Odico
- Bishop Emeritus of Gambia
- Church: Anglican Communion
- Province: Church of the Province of West Africa
- Diocese: Anglican Diocese of Gambia
- Installed: 24 January 2016
- Predecessor: Solomon Tilewa Johnson
- Successor: St Obed Arist Kojo Baiden
- Previous posts: Vicar General, Diocese of Gambia; Dean, St Mary's Cathedral, Banjul

Orders
- Ordination: 1999 (Deacon); 2002 (Priest) by Solomon Tilewa Johnson
- Consecration: 24 January 2016 by Daniel Yinka Sarfo

Personal details
- Born: 10 April 1952 Bathurst, now Banjul, The Gambia
- Died: 23 September 2025 (aged 73)
- Denomination: Anglican Communion
- Spouse: Marian Georgiana Efuah Odico
- Profession: Clergyman, banker

James Allen Yaw Odico (10 April 1952 – 23 September 2025) was a retired Anglican bishop who previously served as Bishop of Gambia.

== Education ==
He was educated at Immanuel College of Theology, Ibadan and ordained deacon in 1999 and priest in 2002.

He served as priest in Serekunda and Banjul. In 2014 he became Vicar general of the Anglican Diocese of Gambia; and in 2015, Dean of the Cathedral Church of St Mary, Banjul.

== Consecration ==
Odico was consecrated and enthroned as the seventh Bishop of Gambia on Sunday 24 January 2016. The five-hour service was presided over by the Primate of the Church of the Province of West Africa, the Most Reverend Daniel Yinka Sarfo, Bishop of Kumasi and Archbishop of Ghana.

== Death ==
Odico died in the late evening of 23 September 2025.
