= Matthias Mededues-Badohu =

Ghanaian bishop

Matthias Mededues-Badohu is an Anglican bishop in Ghana: he was Bishop of Dunkwa-on-Offin and is the current Anglican Bishop of Ho.
