= Anglican Diocese of Kumasi =

Anglican Diocese of Kumasi is a Ghanaian diocese of the Church of the Province of West Africa, a member church of the worldwide Anglican Communion. The current bishop is Daniel Sarfo, the current Primate of West Africa.
