= Robert Prichard (theologian) =

Robert W. Prichard first taught at Virginia Theological Seminary (VTS) as an adjunct faculty member in 1980, joining the faculty full-time in 1983. In 1988 he was made the Arthur Lee Kinsolving Professor of Christianity in America and Instructor in Liturgy at VTS. He retired in 2019, he was name Faculty Emerita.

He obtained his Ph.D. in church history at Emory University in Atlanta, where he focused on theological discourse in the 19th-century Episcopal Church. He previously earned an M.Div. at Berkeley Divinity School at Yale and an A.B. in Spanish at Princeton University.

Before joining the faculty at VTS, Prichard was a parish clergyman in three positions in Virginia. He initiated what became the first Spanish-speaking Episcopal congregation in Virginia (San José, Arlington) and was the vicar of an historically African-African congregation (St. Mary's, Berryville).

He was the first vice president of the Historical Society of the Episcopal Church and a clerical deputy to General Convention (2006, 2009) from the Diocese or Virginia. From 2000 to 2007, he was a member of the Anglican-Roman Catholic Consultation in the U.S.A. (ARCUSA) and has lectured widely to Anglican educational and clerical groups in Latin America. He is the first vice president of the Historical Society of the Episcopal Church.

Prichard is married with two adult sons.

== Books ==
- Editor of John Page Williams, A History of Church Schools in the Diocese of Virginia (Harrisburg: printed by Morehouse for Church Schools in the Diocese of Virginia, 1999).
- A History of the Episcopal Church, second edition (Harrisburg:Morehouse, 1999; first edition 1991).
- The Nature of Salvation: Theological Consensus in the Episcopal Church, 1801-1873, (Champaign, Illinois: University of Illinois Press, 1997).
- Editor of A Wholesome Example: Sexual Morality and the Episcopal Church (Lexington: Bristol Books, 1993).
- The Bat and the Bishop (Wilton, Conn.: Morehouse, 1989).
- Readings from the History of the Episcopal Church (Wilton, Conn.: Morehouse-Barlow, 1986).
- Editor of Odell Greenleaf Harris, It Can be Done: The Autobiography of a Black Priest of the Protestant Episcopal Church Who Started under the Bottom and Moved up to the Top (Alexandria, Virginia: Protestant Episcopal Theological Seminary in Virginia, 1985).

== See also ==
- List of Virginia Theological Seminary people
