= Anglican Diocese of Koforidua =

The Anglican Diocese of Koforidua is a Ghanaian diocese of the Church of the Province of West Africa, a member church of the worldwide Anglican Communion. The current bishop is Felix Odei Annancy.

== Companion dioceses ==
- Chichester (Church of England)
- Portsmouth (Church of England)
- Episcopal Diocese of Los Angeles (US Episcopal Church)
