= Elijah Amoo Addo =

Ghanaian Social Entrepreneur

- Born: Elijah Amoo Addo; 1 August 1990 (age 35); Accra, Ghana
- Education: Sphinx Hospitality school University of Cambridge
- Occupation: Social Entrepreneur/Chef/Food stylist
- Known for: Running food bank for the less privileged
- Parent(s): late Ebenezer Awuku Addo and Naomi Amiokor Ntreh

Elijah Amoo Addo (born 1 August 1990) is a Ghanaian chef and food stylist who has become a social entrepreneur through his creation of Food for All Africa. He is the Co-Founder of Okumkom Biodigital Investment Ltd and the Founder of Biodigital Tech Solutions Ltd in UK. Established in 2014, Food for All Africa is a non-profit social enterprise that operates West Africa's first community food support center. Based in the capital of Ghana, Accra, the organization uses advocacy and a food-sharing mobile phone app to feed thousands of vulnerable children through food recovery and redistribution. Working with local restaurants, supermarkets, food distribution companies, and rural small-hold farmers, Addo's organization collects leftover food or unwanted food that is close to its use-by date and redistributes it to disadvantaged children in orphanages, hospitals and lower-income schools. The organization is also working on the national policy level to make it easier for suppliers to donate food and claim tax benefits. Additionally, after discovering that as much as 46% of the food produced on farms in Ghana goes to waste because of poor roads, broken-down trucks and inefficient marketing, Food for All Africa is collaborating with a range of stakeholders in the Ghanaian food industry to find ways to reduce food wastage.

In 2017, Addo was awarded a Queen's Young Leaders Award by Her Majesty Queen Elizabeth II at Buckingham Palace for his contribution towards the reforming of Ghana's food distribution system to reduce waste, overcome hunger, and alleviate poverty and malnutrition. He also received a Takeda Young Entrepreneurship Award from the Takeda Foundation in 2018.

== Early life and education ==
Addo was born on 1 August 1990 in Accra, Ghana but comes from Akuapem-Mampong. The only boy among four children, he lost his parents at the age of 12 and went to live with his aunt in Lagos, where he attended school. He continued his educational journey at St. Thomas Aquinas Secondary School in Accra, Ghana and then completed a course in culinary studies at Sphinx Hospitality school and catering services in Lagos, Nigeria. He holds a certificate in entrepreneurship and management from YALI West Africa RLC-GIMPA and earned a Leading Change certificate from the University of Cambridge in 2017.

== Chef Career and Activism ==
Addo's journey as a chef started in Lagos, Nigeria when he took up a job in a restaurant as a kitchen porter to support his education. One day, in a hurry to go home, he threw out an olive sauce that the head chef had prepared, thinking it was a waste. This made the chef angry to the extent of insulting him. He started crying and yelled out, "Do you think if my parents were alive, I would be here as a cleaner while my colleagues are in school?" This touched the Head Chef, who decided to mentor him and supported him through culinary studies at Sphinx Vocational Training School in Lagos. After training, he got a job in Marios restaurant, then one of the busiest restaurants in Lagos, and in 2010 returned to Ghana to help a Lebanese businessman who had seen his work in Lagos to open Chase Restaurant. After one year he returned to Lagos at the invitation of his mentor to work in their hotel for six months and rose to become the Sous Chef.

Addo came back to Ghana and in 2011, he met a mentally challenged man who was recovering leftover food from street vendors to feed his mentally challenged colleagues on the streets. This inspired him to start the Chefs for Change Ghana Foundation, an NGO that recovered excess food from hospitality companies to feed the vulnerable and advocate against food wastage and hunger. In 2015, Chefs for Change became the Food for All Africa programme, a social enterprise that operates West Africa's first food bank by creating sustainable means of nutrition for vulnerable children, the elderly and the mentally challenged through food banking, farming and a forum for stakeholders within Ghana's food supply chain.

In 2012, he was selected to head the kitchen at +233 Jazz Bar in Accra and became Secretary of the Greater Accra Chefs Association, where he worked with the leadership of the Association to rebrand and focus on training student chefs to improve the standards of delivery in the job market. He also worked at Burger and Relish but in 2015 resigned to focus on heading the Food For All Africa programme. In 2017, he started the Okumkom ("It Ends Hunger") mobile app as a platform to bring affordable local food products to target communities, with its first community store located in Teshie, Accra.

His organization Food for All Africa recovers between $8,000 and $10,000 worth of food annually to support over 5485 beneficiaries across Ghana and in 2014 was selected as one of the 100 Global Best practices to end hunger and poverty in Ghana by Dubai International Awards for Best practices. It hopes to reach and impact 1 million low-income people by 2020.

In 2017, he was selected as one of change-makers from Africa in the Commonwealth for the Queen's Young Leaders Award by Her Majesty Queen Elizabeth II of the United Kingdom at Buckingham Palace in recognition of his work towards social development across the Commonwealth, feeding the less privileged and reforming Ghana's food distribution system to overcome food waste, hunger, poverty and malnutrition. In 2018, he was awarded the 2018 Takeda Young Entrepreneurship Award at the annual Takeda symposium in Tokyo, Japan for his Okumkom mobile app and community food stores initiative, which brings affordable and convenient local food products to communities through a mobile app, website and community target stores.

== Awards and Recognitions ==
- 2017, Queen's Young Leaders Award
- 2017 100 Most Influential Young Africans
- 2019, Delivered a pitch at the EuroAfrican Forum
