= Melville Jones (bishop) =

Anglican bishop in Nigeria

Frank Melville Jones, CBE, was an Anglican Colonial Bishop in the first half of the 20th century.

He was born in 1866, educated at the Nelson College and the University of New Zealand and ordained in 1890. After a curacy at Holy Trinity, Cheltenham he went out to be a CMS Missionary in Onitsha. He was Principal of the CMS Training College at Oyo In 1919 he became the inaugural Bishop of Lagos, a post he held until 1940. He died on 8 January 1941.

== Notes ==
Church of England titles
Preceded by Inaugural appointment	Bishop of Lagos; 1919 –1940	Succeeded by Leslie Gordon Vining
