= Abraham Kobina Ackah =

Anglican bishop in Ghana

Abraham Kobina Ackah is an Anglican bishop in Ghana: previously an Archdeacon, he has been Bishop of Wiawso since 2006.
