= Jacob Ashburn =

American politician (1880–1955)

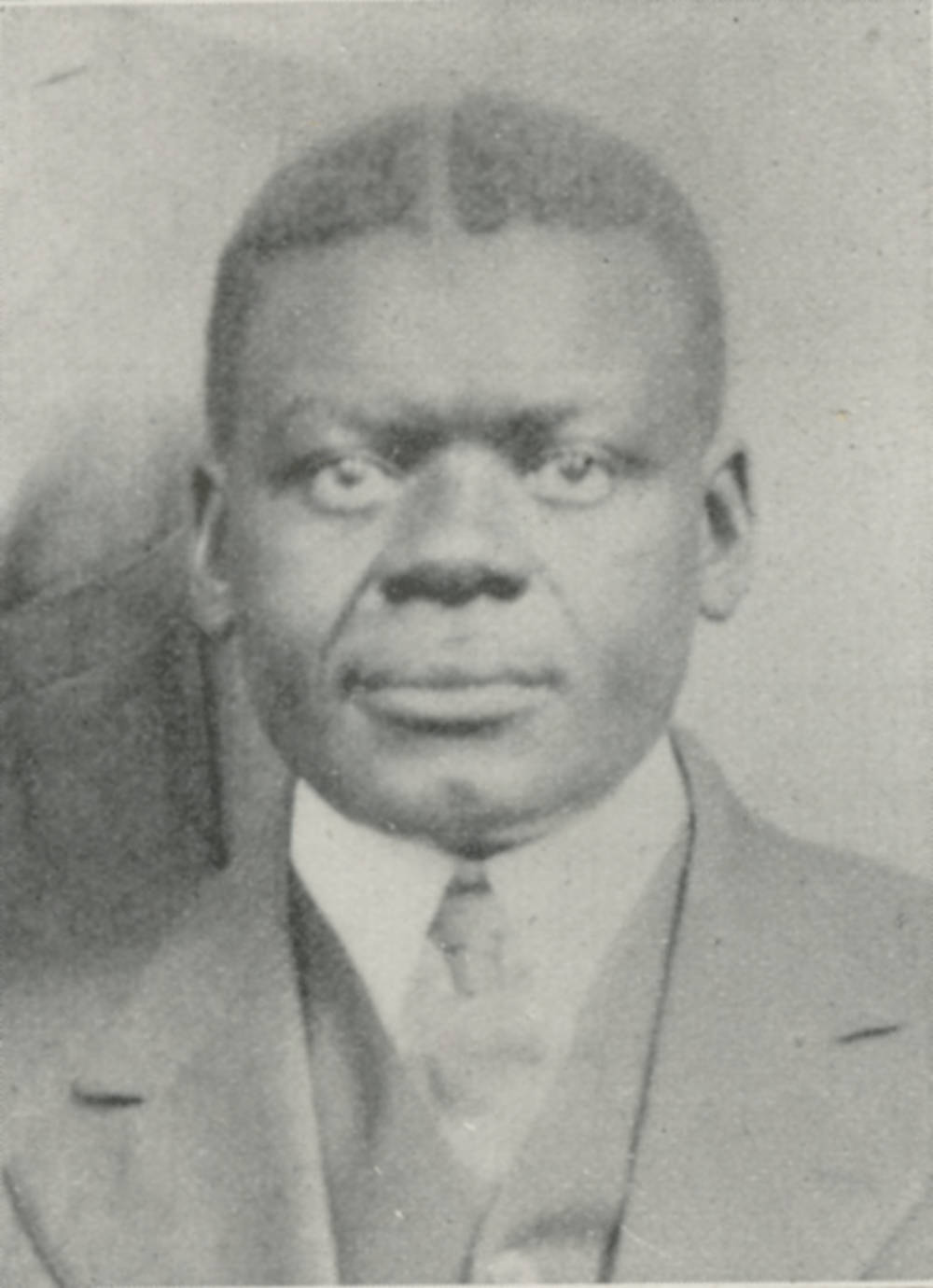

Jacob Julian Ashburn Jr. (November 11, 1880 - September 15, 1955) was a politician in the United States. A Republican, he represented Franklin County, Ohio in the Ohio House of Representatives from 1945 to 1947.

He graduated from the Virginia Theological Seminary. He was a pastor at the Oakley Avenue Baptist Church in Columbus, Ohio. The J. Ashburn Youth Center in the Hilltop neighborhood was founded in 1962 and named in his honor. His namesake son also served as pastor at the church.

== See also ==
- List of African-American officeholders (1900–1959)
