= Lowell Pierson Beveridge =

Lowell Pierson Beveridge (19 September 1905 – 18 June 1991) was an American choral conductor, editor, Episcopal priest, and music educator. Best known for directing the chapel music program at Columbia University during the mid-twentieth century, he later taught liturgics and church music at Virginia Theological Seminary (VTS).

== Early life and education ==
Beveridge was born in Boston, Massachusetts, to a family active in the city's Episcopal life. He earned his A.B. at Harvard University and went on to complete the Ph.D. in musicology there, supplementing his training with graduate study at the Royal College of Music in London. During his Columbia years he was elected a national councillor of the American Guild of Organists and served as publications-committee chair for the Music Library Association. The seminary conferred upon him the honorary degree of Doctor of Divinity in 1952 in recognition of "distinguished service to church music."

== Career ==
After brief service directing the Wellesley College Choir in the 1929–1930 academic year, Beveridge was appointed University Organist and director of music at Columbia University's St. Paul's Chapel in 1930. Over the next two decades he expanded Columbia's Chapel Choir, organized annual tours, and oversaw an ambitious library-building program that turned the chapel’s music library into one of the strongest collegiate choral collections in the country.

Increasingly drawn toward ordained ministry, Beveridge left Columbia in the early 1950s to read for holy orders. Following his ordination he accepted a faculty appointment at Virginia Theological Seminary in Alexandria, where he became the seminary’s first professor of speech and liturgics as well as director of its chorus. His long-running "Pythagoras Project," an anthology of writings on music and the soul, also began during these years.

After retiring from VTS in 1974, Beveridge spent two years at the Tantur Ecumenical Institute in Jerusalem, pursuing comparative liturgical research that informed later lecture tours across the United States.

== Personal life ==
He was married to Ida Louise Gattrell Beveridge. They had two sons, Lowell Pierson "Pete" Beveridge, Jr., and Thomas Beveridge, a choral director and composer who composed a requiem as a memorial to his father.
