= Leslie Vining =

Anglican bishop in Nigeria

Leslie Gordon Vining
- Archbishop of West Africa
- Church: Anglican
- See: Diocese of West Africa
- In office: 1951 – 1955
- Previous posts: Bishop of Lagos; Assistant Bishop on the Niger

Orders
- Ordination: 1911
- Consecration: 1938

Personal details
- Born: 5 February 1885
- Died: 1955 (aged 69–70)

Leslie Gordon Vining CBE (1885 – 4 March 1955) was an English Anglican bishop and the first Archbishop of the Church of the Province of West Africa, from 1951 to 1955.

== Life ==
He attended Emmanuel College, Cambridge and completed his studies in 1910. He was made deacon at Michaelmas (24 September) 1911, by Handley Moule, Bishop of Durham, at Auckland Castle Chapel. He started out as an assistant curate at St. Gabriel's, Bishopwearmouth and later became chaplain to British forces during World War I. After the war, he was the Vicar of St. Alban's, Westbury Park, Bristol in 1918. He was at the post for the next 20 years.

In 1938, he was migrated to Nigeria as an Assistant Bishop on the Niger succeeding Morris Gelsthorpe. He was consecrated a bishop on All Saints' Day (17 November) 1938, by Cosmo Lang, Archbishop of Canterbury, at Westminster Abbey. Vining was appointed the Bishop of Lagos in 1940 after the resignation of Melville Jones in September 1940; he returned to England for part of that year. While in Nigeria, he established a training school for religious teachers. He also tried to be a bridge builder, reaching out to the Lagos Islamic community.

He was elected the first Archbishop of the newly created Church of the Province of West Africa (remaining diocesan Bishop of Lagos), on the afternoon of the province's inauguration on 17 April 1951; he was duly enthroned as such that evening. He was still in both posts when he died at sea on his way to England on 4 March 1955. He was buried in Freetown, Sierra Leone.
