= Anglican Diocese of Wiawso =

The Anglican Diocese of Wiawso is a Ghanaian diocese of the Church of the Province of West Africa, a member church of the worldwide Anglican Communion. The first bishop was Rt. Rev'd Abraham Kobina Ackah, who was consecrated and enthroned in 2006.The current bishop is Rt. Rev'd Kwame Kyem-Ampomah (Consecrated and enthroned in 2021).
