= George Browne (archbishop of West Africa) =

The Most Reverend George Browne
- Archbishop of West Africa
- Church: Church of the Province of West Africa
- Diocese: Liberia
- Predecessor: Ishmael Mills Le-Maire
- Successor: Robert Okine

Orders
- Ordination: 1962 (deacon); 1963 (priest)
- Consecration: August 6, 1970
- Rank: Archbishop

Personal details
- Born: 1933 Cape Palmas
- Died: 1993 (aged 59–60) Milwaukee

George Daniel Browne (1933 – 14 February 1993) was the first indigenous Bishop of Liberia in The Episcopal Church.

== Birth and education ==
He was born in Cape Palmas, Liberia, and was educated at Cuttington University, in Suacoco, and later at the Virginia Theological Seminary in the United States.

== Ecclesiastical career ==
Browne was ordained deacon in 1962, and priest in 1963. He was ordained and consecrated Bishop of the Diocese of Liberia on August 6, 1970 and became Archbishop of West Africa in 1982, continuing to serve as Archbishop and Bishop of Liberia through the outbreak of the First Liberian Civil War in December 1989. He remained in Liberia as a negotiator between rival factions — at one point out of contact with the outside world for nine months — and in July 1991 addressed the Episcopal Church's 70th General Convention on his experience of the war.

== Death ==
He died on 14 February 1993 in Milwaukee, United States (the home town of one of his children) after a long struggle with terminal illness and deteriorating health. He was succeeded as Archbishop of West Africa by Robert Okine, elected 8 October 1993.
