= Anglican Diocese of Dunkwa-on-Offin =

The Anglican Diocese of Dunkwa-on-Offin is a Ghanaian diocese of the Church of the Province of West Africa, a member church of the worldwide Anglican Communion. Its partner diocese is the Diocese of Portsmouth. The current bishop is Edmund Dawson Ahmoah.
