= Festus Yeboah Asuamah =

Ghanaian bishop

Festus Yeboah Asuamah is an Anglican bishop in Ghana: he has been the Bishop of Sunyani since 2009.
