= John Daly (bishop) =

Anglican bishop in Africa and Asia (1901–1985)

John Charles Sydney Daly (1901–1985) was an Anglican bishop in Africa and Asia for fifty years.

== Education ==
Educated at Gresham's School, Holt, and King's College, Cambridge, Daly was ordained as a Church of England deacon and priest in 1923.

== Career ==
In 1935, he became the youngest bishop in the Anglican communion when he was appointed as bishop of the new Diocese of Gambia and Guinea (sometimes called Gambia and the Rio Pongas). He was consecrated a bishop on the Feast of Saints Philip and James (1 May) 1935, by Cosmo Lang, Archbishop of Canterbury, at All Hallows-by-the-Tower.

During the Second World War, Daly also served as a District Scout commissioner. In 1944 he led the Gambian contingent attending a Jamboree at Katibougou in the French Sudan (now Mali), jointly organised for Francophone and Anglophone Boy Scouts.

He was later translated to become the Anglican bishop of the dioceses of Accra (1951–1955), Korea (1956–1965), and Taejon (1965–1968).

Daly's appointment as Bishop in Korea followed the Korean War of 1950 to 1953, leaving him with major challenges for his mission. Most contact with North Korea was severed, and the country faced huge economic, political and social problems. Translated from Accra to Korea on 15 July 1955, he was enthroned at the Cathedral Church of St Mary and St Nicholas, Seoul, on 17 January 1956.

In 1965, the Diocese of Korea was divided into two when Paul Ch’on-Hwan Li (Paul Lee, the first Korean bishop of the Anglican Church in Korea) was consecrated as Bishop of Seoul and Daly became Bishop of Taejon.

Daly lived to celebrate his fiftieth year as a bishop. The Bishop John Daly Mission Center at Gumi, South Korea, was named in memory of him.

== Career summary ==
- Church of England priest, 1923
- Bishop of Gambia and Guinea (or Gambia and the Rio Pongas), 1935–1951
- Bishop of Accra, 1951–1955
- Bishop of Korea, 1956–1965
- Bishop of Taejon, 1965–1968
- Assistant Bishop of Coventry, 1968–1975
- Priest-in-charge of Honington, Warwickshire with Idlicote and Whatcote, 1968–1970
- Vicar of Bishop's Tachbrook, 1970–1975

Church of England titles
Preceded by New diocese	Bishop of Gambia and the Rio Pongas; 1935 – 1951	Succeeded by Roderic Norman Coote
Preceded by John Orfeur Aglionby	Bishop of Accra; 1951 – 1955	Succeeded by Reginald Richard Roseveare
Preceded by Alfred Cecil Cooper	Bishop in Korea; 1955 – 1965	Succeeded by Diocese divided
Preceded by New diocese	Bishop of Taejon; 1965 – 1968	Succeeded by Cecil Richard Rutt
