= Victor Atta-Baffoe =

Ghanaian bishop

Victor Atta-Baffoe is an Anglican bishop and scholar in Ghana: he is the current Bishop of Cape Coast.
