= Edmund Dawson Ahmoah =

Anglican bishop

Edmund Dawson Ahmoah is an Anglican bishop in Ghana: he is the current Bishop of Dunkwa-on-Offin.
