= Anglican Diocese of Sunyani =

The Anglican Diocese of Sunyani is a Ghanaian diocese of the Church of the Province of West Africa, a member church of the worldwide Anglican Communion. The current bishop is Festus Yeboah Asuamah.
