= John Gottlieb Auer =

Second bishop of the Episcopal Diocese of Liberia

- Bishop of Liberia
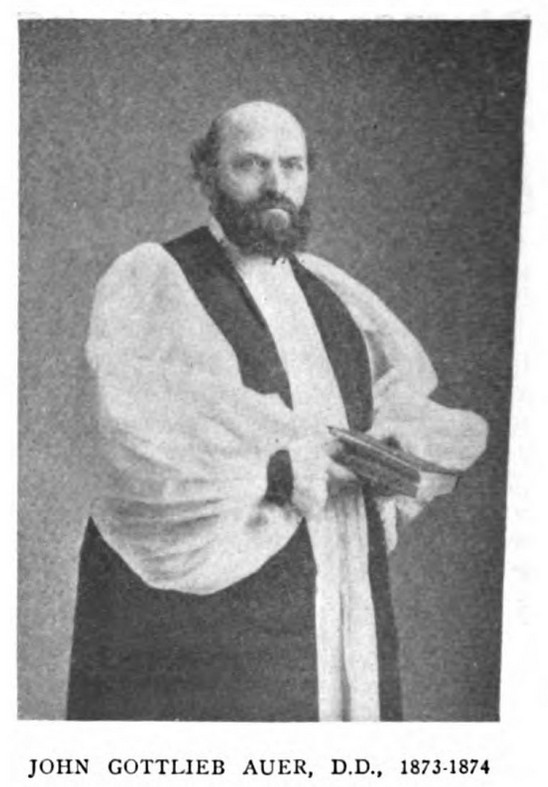
- J.G. Auer
- Church: The Episcopal Church

Orders
- Consecration: 17 April 1873

Personal details
- Born: 18 November 1832 Neubulach, German Confederation
- Died: 16 February 1874 (aged 41) Cavalla Mission, Cape Palmas, Liberia

John Gottlieb Auer (November 18, 1832-February 16, 1874) was the second bishop of the Episcopal Diocese of Liberia.

Born in Württemberg, Germany, Auer was a Lutheran minister, but applied for and took orders in the Episcopal church, being ordained at Cavalla, Africa, in 1862. At a special meeting of the general convention, in October, 1872, Dr. Auer was elected missionary bishop of Cape Palmas, in Africa. He was consecrated 17 April, 1873. but was stricken down with fever, and his term of service was less than one year.
