= Anglican Diocese of Accra =

Member church of the Anglican Communion

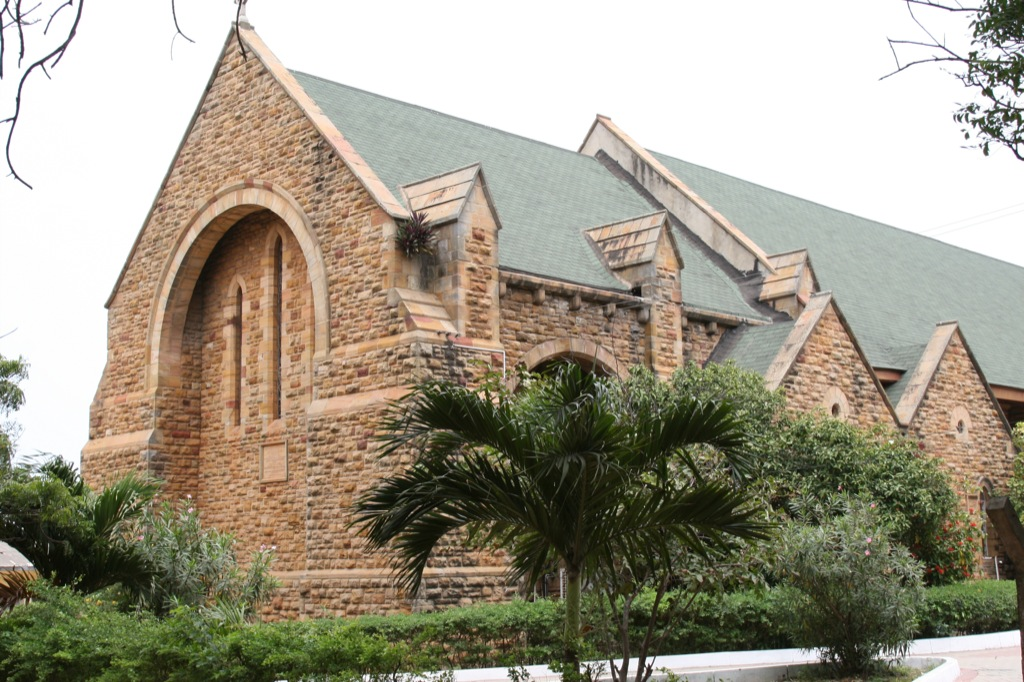
Holy Trinity Cathedral, Accra

The Anglican Diocese of Accra is a diocese of the Church of the Province of West Africa, a member church of the Anglican Communion. It was founded in 1909 by the Archbishop of Canterbury. The cathedral of the diocese is Holy Trinity Cathedral in Accra, Ghana.

The Anglican Diocese of Accra (ADOA) is the oldest in the Internal Province of Ghana, and in terms of clergy and churches, is Ghana's largest diocese. The diocese is made up of over one hundred parishes, congregations and missions with over 120 clergy, both male and female. The diocese is organized under five clusters namely the Deanery, Accra East Archdeaconry, Accra West Archdeaconry, Accra North Archdeaconry, Accra North-East Archdeaconry and the Tema Archdeaconry.

The diocese was carved out of the Diocese of Equatorial Africa in 1909 after some two centuries of missionary work in the then Gold Coast. In response to that growth, and in consonance with the Anglican polity of "Synodically Governed and Episcopally led" the Diocese of Accra was created. The succession of Diocesan bishops have been Nathaniel Temple Hamlyn (1909–1910), Mowbray Stephen O'Rorke (1913–1923), John Orfeur Aglionby (1924–1951), John Charles Sydney Daly (1951–1955), Reginald Richard Roseveare (1956–1967). So for the duration of the colonial era of Gold Coast, the Anglican Diocese was led by expatriate bishops.

With the metamorphosis of Gold Coast to the sovereign independent nation of Ghana on 6 March 1957, the Diocese of Accra which covered the whole geographic area of Ghana, began to have Ghanaian leaders – Ishmael Samuel Mills LeMaire (1968–1982), Francis William Banahene Thompson (1983–1996), Justice Ofei Akrofi (1996–2012) and Daniel Sylvanus Mensah Torto, the current bishop, who was consecrated on 24 June 2012 and enthroned on 11 November 2012.

== List of bishops ==
- 1909 Temple Hamlyn
- 1913 Mowbray O'Rorke
- 1924 John Aglionby
- 1951 John Daly
  - 1951–1968 Ezra Martinson, Assistant Bishop
- 1956 Richard Roseveare
- 1968 Ishmael Mills Le-Marie (also Archbishop of West Africa, 1981–82)
- 1983 Francis Thompson
- 1996 Justice Akrofi (also Archbishop of West Africa, 2003–12)
- 2012 Daniel Torto
