= Charles Clifton Penick =

American missionary bishop

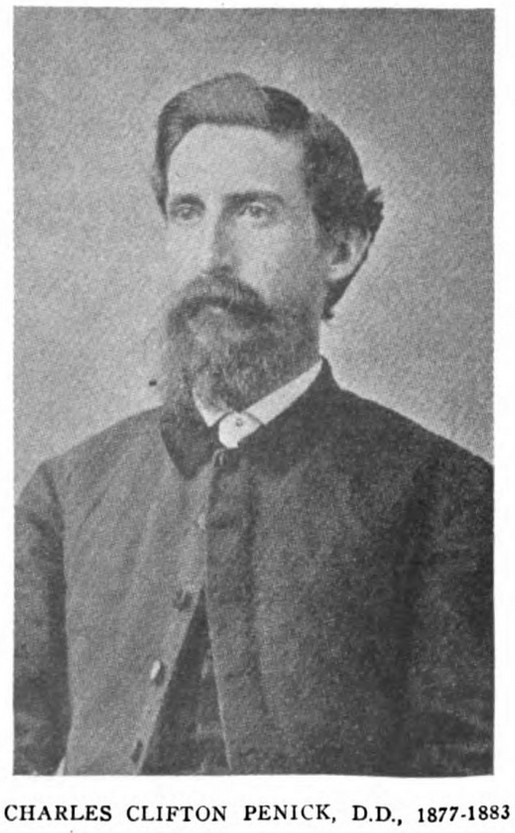
Bishop Charles Clifton Penick

Charles Clifton Penick (December 9, 1843 – April 13, 1914) was third missionary bishop of Cape Palmas, Africa, and Parts Adjacent from 1877 to 1883. He attended Hampden-Sydney College in Virginia. He studied divinity at the Virginia Theological Seminary in Alexandria, graduating in 1869. He was consecrated as a bishop at the Church of the Messiah, Baltimore, on February 13, 1877.

== Bibliography ==
- More than a Prophet (New York: Thomas Whittaker, 1881)
