= Cyril Kobina Ben-Smith =

Ghanaian Anglican Bishop and Archbishop

Cyril Kobina Ben-Smith (born 21 February 1964) is a Ghanaian Anglican Bishop. He is the current Bishop of Asante Mampong and Archbishop and Primate of the Church of the Province of West Africa in June 2022, in succession to Archbishop Jonathan Hart of Liberia.

In 2026, Ben-Smith said, that criminalization of same-sex acts has no support by him and the Church of Ghana.
