= Dibo Thomas-Babyngton Elango =

Dibo Thomas-Babyngton Elango is an Anglican bishop in Cameroon. He is the current Bishop of Cameroon.

Elango was born in Limbe and educated at the Government Teachers' Training College in Kumba. He was ordained deacon in 1999 and priest in 2000. He was enthroned as bishop in April 2008.
