= Anglican Diocese of Freetown =

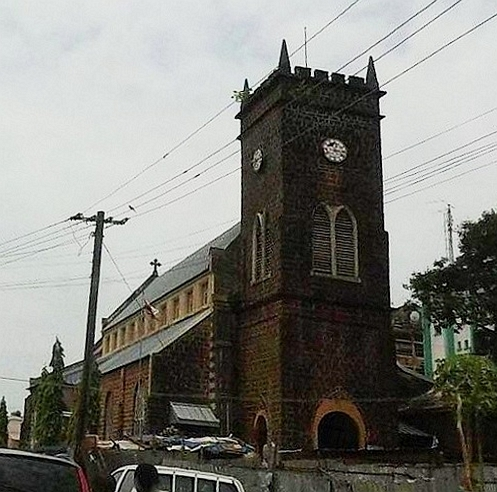
St. George's Cathedral, Freetown in Sierra Leone

The Anglican Diocese of Freetown (Sierra Leone) is a diocese of the Church of the Province of West Africa, a member church of the worldwide Anglican Communion. The current diocese, along with the Anglican Diocese of Bo, was formed in 1981 by the partition of the previous Diocese of Sierra Leone, which had been established in 1852. The diocese of Sierra Leone, together with the dioceses of Niger, Accra, Lagos and the Diocese of Gambia and the River Pongas, had been formed, with some local resistance, into the Province of West Africa in 1951.

The cathedral of the diocese is St. George's Cathedral, Freetown, Sierra Leone, which was built between 1817 and 1828.

The current (2015) Bishop of Freetown is Thomas Arnold Wilson, the third Bishop of the Diocese.

== Bishops of Freetown ==
- 1981–?1994 Prince Eustace Thompson (died 1994)
- 1996–2013 Julius O. Prince Lynch
- 2013–present Thomas Arnold Wilson (3rd bishop)
