= Solomon Tilewa Johnson =

Gambian Anglican bishop

The Most Reverend Solomon Tilewa Johnson
- Archbishop of West Africa, Bishop of Gambia
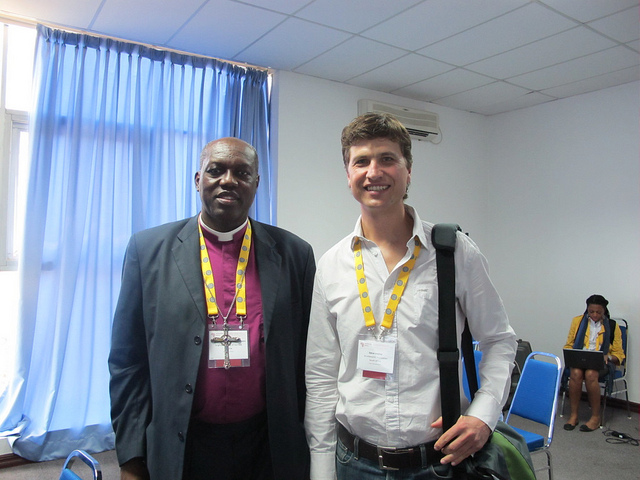
- Solomon Tilewa Johnson (left), in 2010
- Church: Church of the Province of West Africa
- Predecessor: Justice Akrofi

Orders
- Ordination: 1979 (deacon); 1980 (priest)
- Consecration: 1990
- Rank: Archbishop

Personal details
- Born: 1954 Bathurst
- Died: 2014 (aged 59–60) Bakau, Fajara

Solomon Tilewa Ethelbert Willie Johnson (27 February 1954 - 21 January 2014) was a Gambian Anglican bishop. He was the bishop of the Anglican Diocese of Gambia and the Rio Pongas and archbishop of the Church of the Province of West Africa. He was married and had a son and two daughters.

== Early life and studies ==
Born at Bathurst (now Banjul) in 1954, he attended primary school at Banjul from 1962 to 1966. In 1974 he became a teacher at Gambia High School. He moved to Nigeria, where he studied at Trinity College in Umuahia from 1977 to 1980, earning a degree in Theology in 1980. He pursued his studies at the University of Durham, England, from 1982 to 1985, graduating with a BA in Theology with his dissertation The Impact of African Communal Ritual on Modern Christian Missions, 1821-1965.

== Ecclesiastical career ==
Johnson was ordained as a deacon in 1979 and a priest in 1980. He was consecrated the sixth bishop of the Diocese of Gambia and the Rio Pongas in 1990, the first Gambian national to hold the office, which he retained until his death. He was elected the ninth Archbishop Primate of the Church of the Province of West Africa (CPWA) on 28 September 2012, succeeding Justice Akrofi. At the same time it was resolved to divide the CPWA into two internal (or metropolitical) provinces, the Province of Ghana (of which Daniel Sarfo became the first Metropolitan archbishop), and the Province of West Africa, of which Johnson was the Metropolitan archbishop as well as being the archbishop primate of CPWA. He was a strong supporter of Anglican realignment, attending GAFCON II, that took place in Nairobi, Kenya, from 21 to 26 October 2013.

== Death ==
He died unexpectedly aged 59, after collapsing while playing tennis on the evening of 21 January 2014. He was taken to the Medical Research Council in Bakau-Fajara, where he was pronounced dead.

Archbishop Eliud Wabukala, of the Anglican Church of Kenya, said upon his death: "It was with shock and great sadness that we heard about the sudden death of our brother Primate, S. Tilewa Johnson, earlier this week. In October last year we shared fellowship at GAFCON 2013 here in Nairobi and we thank God for his commitment to our Lord Jesus Christ whom he served with a robust faith and cheerful energy throughout his ministry. He was a man of global vision and his death, so untimely from our human perspective, has deprived not only the Church of the Province of West Africa, but the whole Anglican Communion of a talented leader."

== Family ==
His mother-in-law was former Deputy Speaker of the National Assembly of the Gambia Cecilia Cole.

Anglican Communion titles
| Preceded by Justice Akrofi | Primate of the Church of the Province of West Africa; 2012–2014 | Succeeded by Daniel Sarfo |
| New title | Patron of the Old Catholic Confederation; 2013–2014 | Vacant |
