= Anglican Diocese of Tamale =

The Anglican Diocese of Tamale, (Ghana) is a diocese of the Church of the Province of West Africa, a member church of the worldwide Anglican Communion and part of the Internal Province of Ghana. The cathedral of the diocese is Bishop Aglionby Memorial Cathedral, Tamale, Ghana, which was built in the 1960s.

The current diocese was formed in February 1997 by the partition of the previous Diocese of Sunyani/Tamale which had itself been established in 1981 out of the older Kumasi diocese.

The Bishop of Tamale, the Honourable the Right Reverend Dr Jacob Kofi Ayeebo, the second Bishop of the Diocese, died on 19 February 2019, aged 58. Dr Ayeebo was also an elected member of Ghana's Council of State, representing the Upper East region.

== Extent of the Diocese ==
The diocese of Tamale extends to all three of Ghana's northern regions, namely the Northern, Upper East and Upper West regions.

The diocese covers approximately 17% of Ghana's population and 59% of its land area.

== Bishops of Tamale ==
- 1997 - 2011 Emmanuel A Arongo
- 2011 – 2019 Jacob Kofi Ayeebo
- 2020 - Dennis Tong

== Clergy ==
The diocese currently has approximately 22 clergy, mainly in Tamale, areas around Wa and in the Upper East around Bolgatanga and Bawku and towns in between. A number of men and women are in training.

The diocesan synod voted in 2001 to accept women for ordination to the priesthood, the first in the Province of West Africa to do so. The first woman was ordained in 2015.

== International Links ==
The Diocese is linked with the Deanery of the Isle of Wight, in the Portsmouth Diocese in the Church of England.

== Development ==
The Diocese has founded ADDRO, the Anglican Diocesan Development and Relief Organisation which is responsible for a number of health and education related programmes in the diocese. Some of these are supported and funded by other parts of the Anglican Communion.
