= Justice Akrofi =

Ghanaian Anglican Bishop

The Most Reverend Justice Akrofi
- Archbishop of West Africa, Bishop of Accra
- Church: Church of the Province of West Africa
- Predecessor: Robert Okine

Orders
- Consecration: 1996

Personal details
- Born: 1942 (age 83–84)

Justice Ofei Akrofi (born 1942) is a Ghanaian Anglican bishop. He is the former Anglican Bishop of Accra, Ghana and former archbishop (primate) of the Church of the Province of West Africa. He was elected to that position in 2003, which he held until 2012. The archbishop is married to physician Maria Eugenia Akrofi, and they have two children.

== Education ==
Akrofi studied in Ghana and in the United States at Central Connecticut State College (University), receiving B.Sc. and M.Ed. degrees, and at Yale, where he graduated in 1976 with a Master of Divinity degree. Later, he taught at Cape Coast University and the University of Ghana before serving as dean of Holy Trinity Cathedral in Accra and later as Bishop of Accra from 1996 to 2012. In 2000, Akrofi received an honorary doctorate from Central Connecticut State University.

== Anglican realignment ==
Like most African Anglican prelates, Akrofi is widely regarded as a conservative in the Anglican Communion and has been involved in the Anglican realignment. The Church of the Province of West Africa was one of the first to break communion with the Episcopal Church of the United States over the question of admitting non-celibate homosexual clergy. He is a supporter of the Fellowship of Confessing Anglicans and of the Anglican Church in North America. He attended the Global Anglican Future Conference, in Jerusalem, in June 2008.

Anglican Communion titles
Preceded by Robert Okine	Primate of the Church of the Province of West Africa; 2003–2012	Succeeded by Solomon Tilewa Johnson
