= Élysée (disambiguation) =

The Élysée Palace is the official residence of the President of France.

Élysée may also refer to:

People

- Elysée (footballer) (born 1989), Ivorian footballer
- Elysée Loustallot (1761–1790) French lawyer and writer

Cars

- Citroën Elysée, small saloon produced jointly with Dongfeng in China since 2002
- Aronde Elysée, Simca Aronde variant produced 1956–1963

Buildings

- Elysée Arena, ice hockey arena in Turku, Finland
- Château Élysée, hotel in Los Angeles, California, United States
- Hotel Elysée, hotel in New York City, New York, United States
- Musée de l'Élysée, museum in Lausanne, Switzerland

== See also ==
- Champs-Élysées (disambiguation)
- Élisée, a list of people with the given name
- Jean Rigal Elisée (1927–2017), Episcopalian bishop in the Gambia
- Elysium (disambiguation)
