= Second Story =

Second Story may refer to:

- Second Story Press
- Second Story Interactive Studios
- Second Story (The Hang Ups album)
- Second Story (ClariS album)
- Second Story, album Open House (band)
- Second Story, album Park Hyo-shin

See also:
