= Australian Centre for the Moving Image =

National museum of screen culture in Melbourne, Australia

ACMI

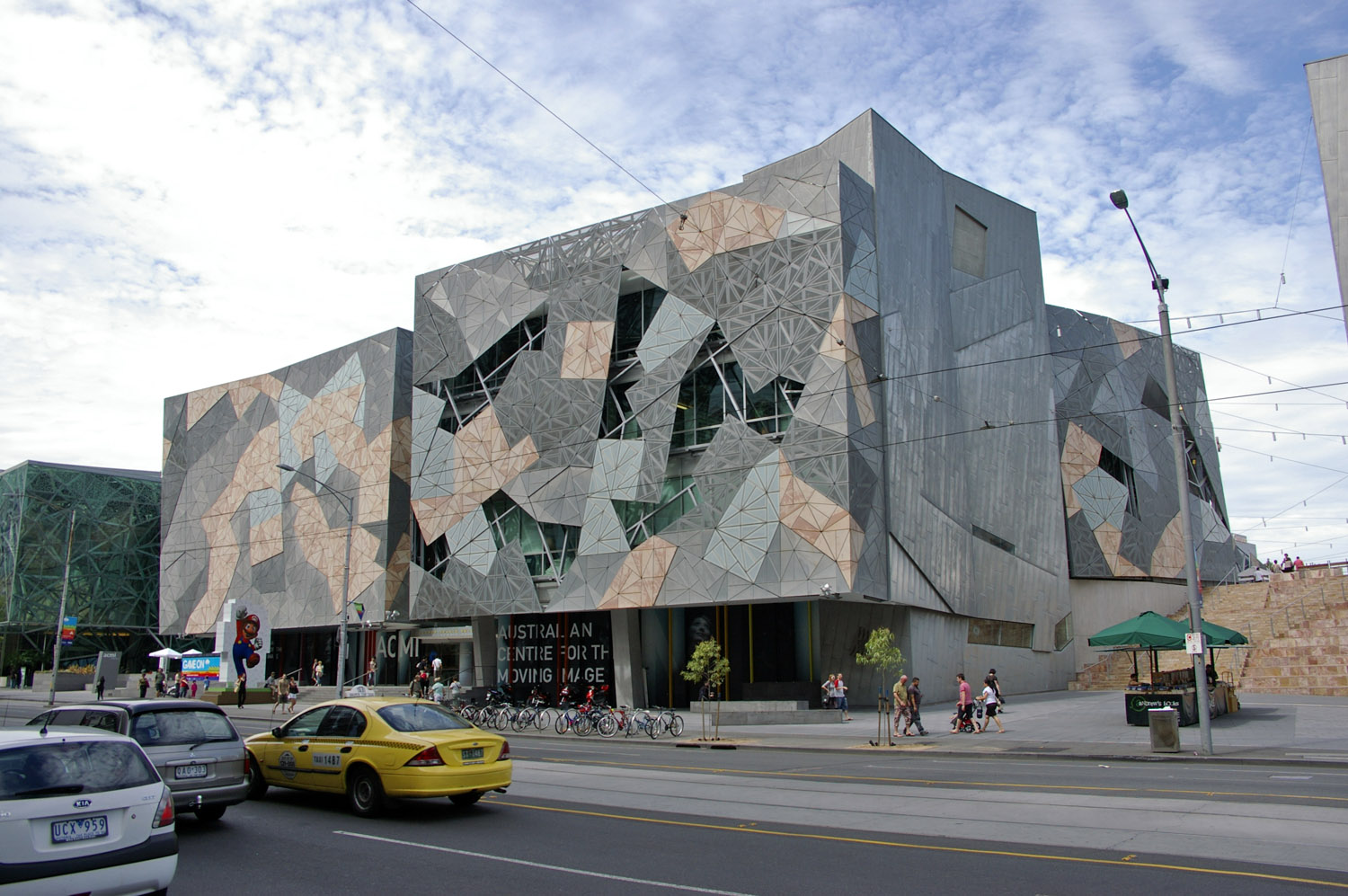
- Established: 2002
- Location: Federation Square, Melbourne, Australia
- Coordinates: 37.817438°S 144.969533°E
- Visitors: 1,316,000 (2016)
- Director: Sebastian Chan
- Public transit access: Flinders Street; Stop 13 – Federation Square
- Website: acmi.net.au

ACMI, formerly the Australian Centre for the Moving Image, is Australia's national museum of screen culture including film, television, videogames, digital culture and art. ACMI was established in 2002 and is based at Federation Square in Melbourne, Victoria.

ACMI features a range of curated exhibitions as well as a permanent exhibition, The Story of the Moving Image. It also provides a regular program film screenings and events, a library and online collection of film and video and an education program.

== History ==
=== Beginnings in the State Film Centre of Victoria ===
Prior to ACMI, Victoria's main film and screen organisation was the State Film Centre of Victoria, based at Treasury Theatre, which was established in 1946.

In the 1950s, the State Film Centre was involved in producing a number of projects for television, then a new medium in Australia. It also played a role as an archive of Australian films, such as The Sentimental Bloke (1919) and On Our Selection (1920).

During the 1960s, the State Film Centre provided advice on film treatments, production, scripts and distribution outlets to local filmmakers. In 1969, the centre assumed management of the newly constructed State Film Theatre, providing a facility for exhibiting material not screened in commercial cinemas.

In the 1970s, the centre began acquiring examples of student films as well as those made by the newly vibrant Australian film industry, such as Homesdale (1971) by Peter Weir, Stork (1971) and Alvin Purple (1973) by Tim Burstall, and The Devil's Playground (1976) by Fred Schepisi.

In 1988, the State Film Centre Education Program was set up. The program provided screenings for Victorian Certificate of Education students, based on core texts, and in-service days for their teachers.

=== Establishing ACMI at Federation Square ===
In 1993, a Victorian state government report reaffirmed the viability of a proposal for an Australian Centre for the Moving Image. In July 1997, following an open, international and two-stage design competition, Lab Architecture Studio (based in London at the time), in association with their joint venture partners, Bates Smart architects, was announced as the winner. Federation Square was to be a new civic space, built above the Jolimont railyards, to mark the celebration of Australia's Centenary of Federation.

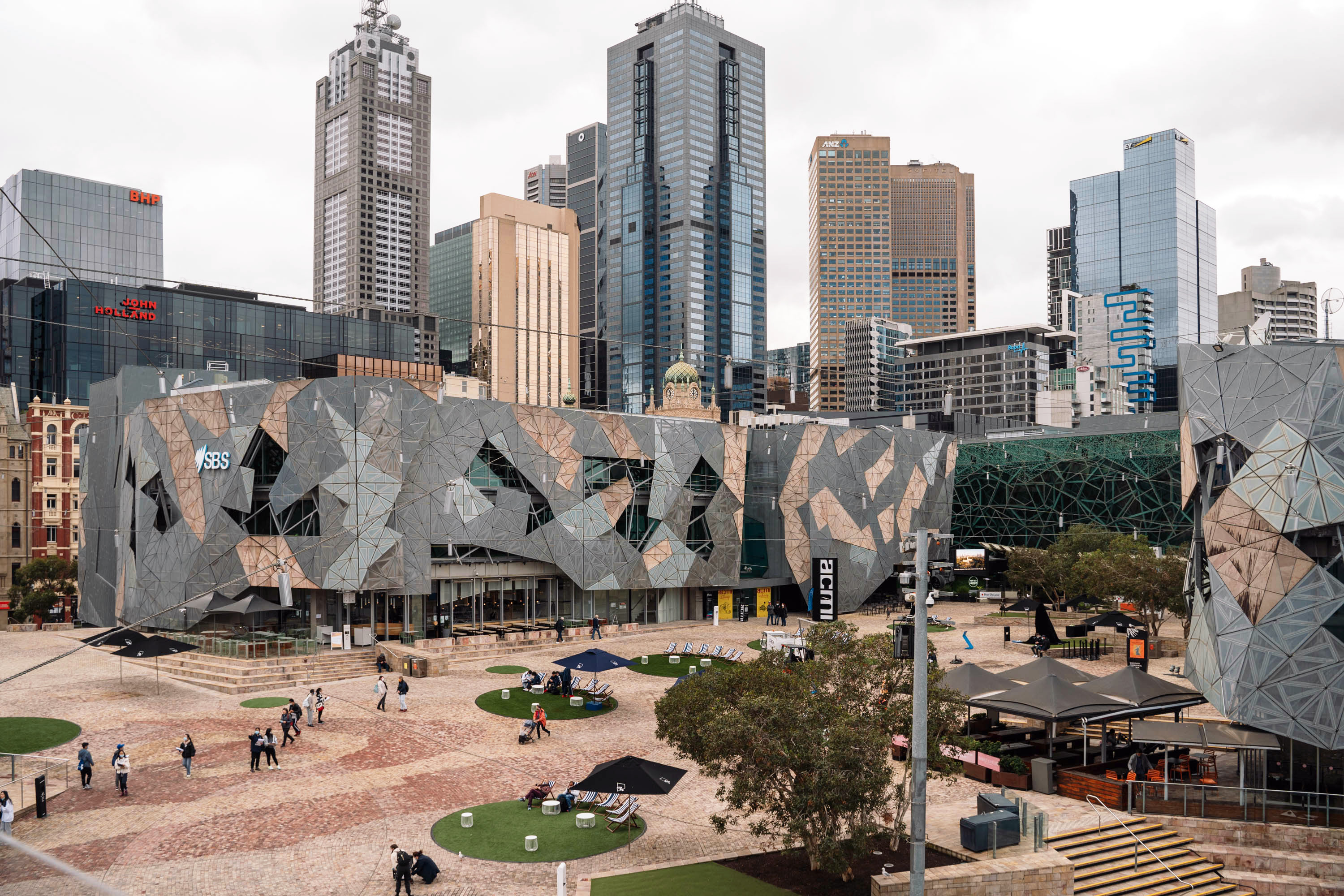
An aerial view of ACMI in Fed Square, Melbourne (photo by Phoebe Powell)

On 1 January 2002, the Australian Centre for the Moving Image was officially established by the Film Act 2001 (Victoria). The first stage was opened in October, with two exhibitions, Deep Space: Sensation & Immersion and Ngarinyin Pathways Dulwan, running in ACMI's Screen Gallery. A few weeks later, ACMI Cinemas officially opened.

In September 2009, the Australian Mediatheque and the Screen Worlds gallery opened. The Screen Worlds exhibition was opened by Cate Blanchett, who loaned her Oscar for best supporting actress for her part as Katharine Hepburn in The Aviator. Screen Worlds: The Story of Film, Television and Digital Culture is a free and permanent exhibition space constructed to educate the public about the moving image, a museum about moving pictures. The Mediatheque is a partnership with the National Film and Sound Archive (NFSA), which provides a space with 12 viewing booths where people can drop in and watch films, television clips, and new media and artworks from the NFSA and ACMI collections.

=== 2021 Renewal ===
In May 2019, ACMI closed to the public to begin a $40 million redevelopment. It reopened to the public in February 2021 with a new permanent exhibition The Story of the Moving Image.

ACMI partnered with Melbourne architectural firm BKK Architects, who redesigned the museum's functional layout and public spaces. Experience design firm Publicis Sapient/Second Story designed ACMI's centrepiece exhibition The Story of the Moving Image, the Gandel Digital Future Labs and the Blackmagic Design Media Preservation Lab. ACMI partnered with Melbourne chef, restaurateur, writer and television presenter Karen Martini and Michael Gebran of HospitalityM to launch its restaurant, bar and café Hero.

=== Directors ===
From 1992, John J. Smithies was Director of the State Film Centre of Victoria, until its merger with Film Victoria in 1997 formed Cinemedia. At Cinemedia, Smithies was deputy director, with prime responsibility for developing the Australian Centre for the Moving Image. He became the first director and CEO of ACMI in March 2002. He was responsible for opening the new public facilities in October 2002. After a period of turmoil, with the organisation over budget, Smithies left ACMI in 2004, and later said the facility had been forced to open while "under-funded" by the Victorian Government.

Tony Sweeney was appointed director and CEO of ACMI in 2005. Before his move to Australia, he had been the deputy director of the National Museum of Photography, Film & Television (UK), and focused on developing the museum's brand profile and content strategies. He directed the museum's Imaging Frontiers masterplan re-development, which generated record visitor numbers and international critical acclaim. The museum is now seen as one of the leading international centres for culture and learning of its kind in the world. At ACMI he oversaw record organisational growth, performance and visitation, and a prolonged period of sustained success and achievement. Having spent ten years in the role, Sweeney resigned in order to return to his family in Britain.

Katrina Sedgwick was ACMI Director and CEO from February 2015–22. She moved to the new Melbourne Arts Precinct Corporation (MapCo) in March 2023.

In August 2022, Seb Chan was appointed Director and CEO. Chan joined ACMI in 2015 as Chief Experience Officer. He is current President of the Australian Museums and Galleries Association.

== The Story of the Moving Image ==
ACMI's 1,600sqm centrepiece exhibition explores the past, present and future of film, television, videogames and art, and features over 900 objects from around Australia and the world.

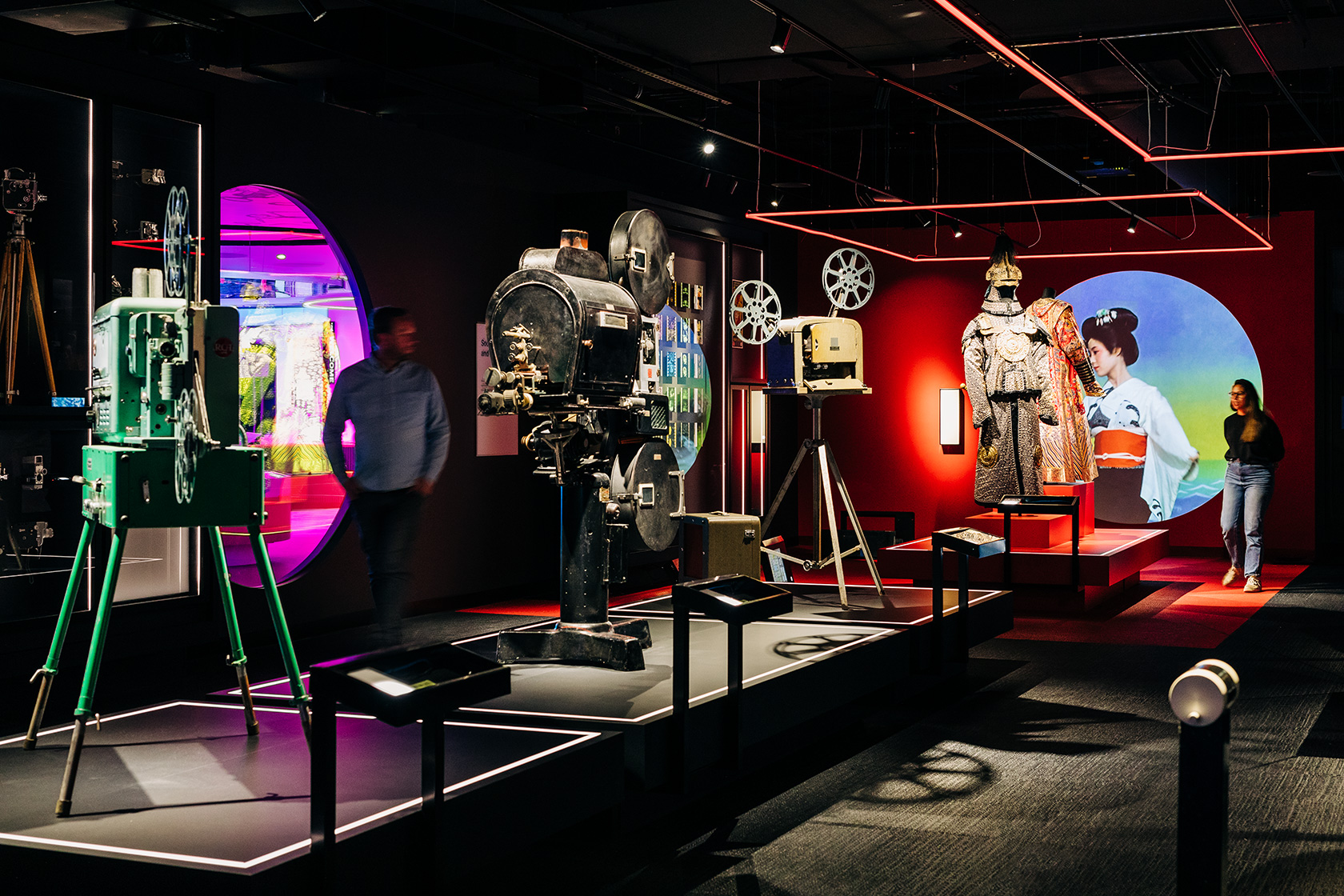
Costumes and objects in The Story of the Moving Image (photo by Adam Gibson)

=== Exhibition sections ===
==== Moving Pictures ====
The Story of the Moving Image begins with objects and interactive experiences that showcase people, techniques and inventions that contributed to the development of motion pictures.

==== Moving Worlds ====
Costumes, characters, set and production design, storyboarding, visual effects and Foley are featured in the Moving Worlds section to illustrate the creative processes behind iconic films, TV shows and videogames.

==== Moving Australia ====
Featuring objects and installations from Australia's screen industry, including prominent works by First Nations artists.

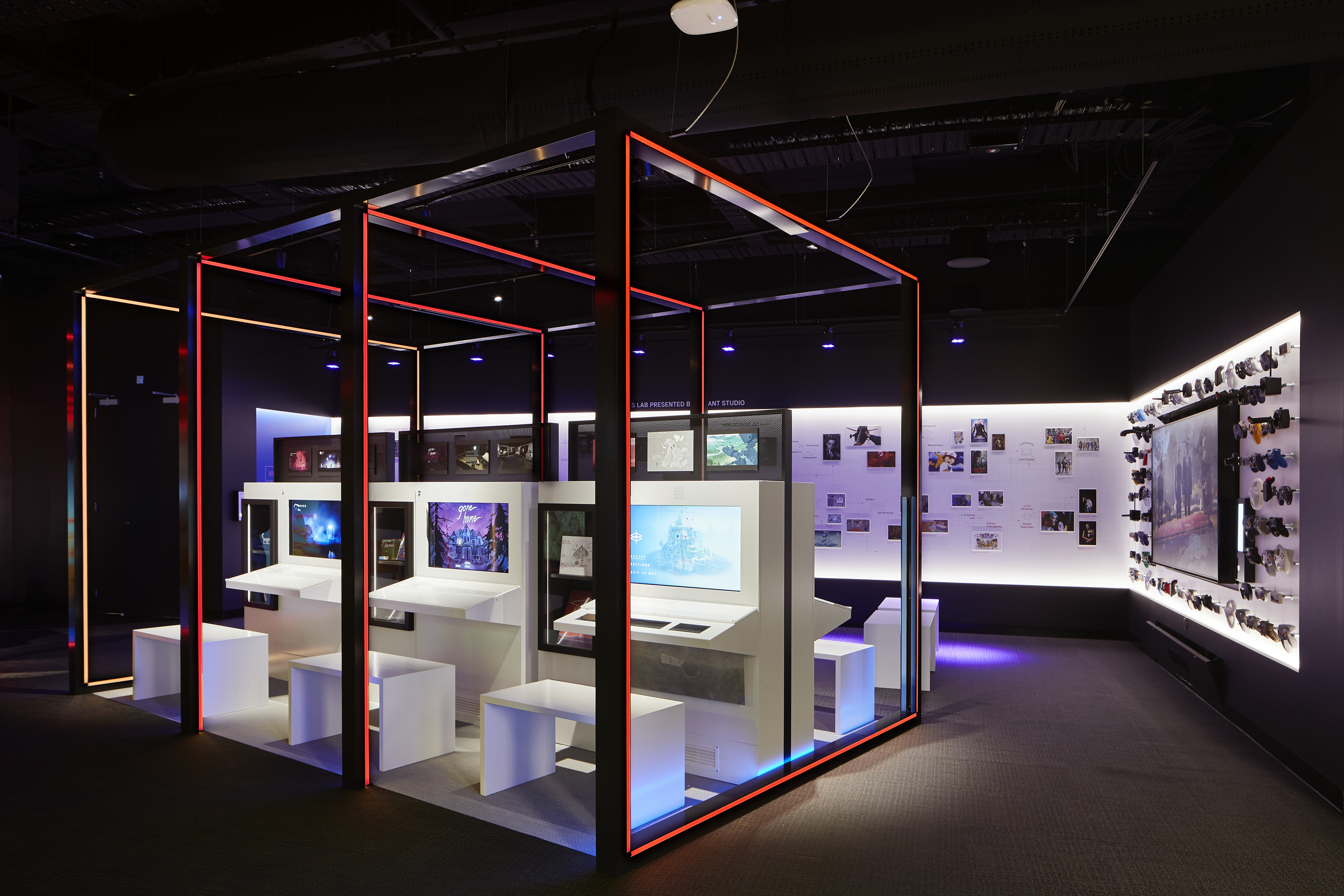
Games Lab presented by Big Ant Studios in The Story of the Moving Image (photo by Shannon McGrath)

==== Games Lab presented by Big Ant Studios ====
Games Lab features videogames from local and international independent developers and AAA publishers. The section contains twelve playable games, plus artworks and interpretive information about the history of videogames. Games Lab is presented in partnership with Melbourne-based game developer Big Ant Studios.

==== Moving Minds ====
Moving Minds encompasses factual media and information that traverses the history of newsreels, broadcast TV, documentary, war reporting and propaganda, citizen journalism and video art.

==== First Nations artworks ====
Artworks and installations by First Nations artists feature prominently throughout The Story of the Moving Image. Key works include Yanmeeyar, an art installation by Gunditjmara artist Vicki Couzens that is found at the beginning and the end of the exhibition; Canopy, a multi-screen installation by artist John Harvey; and the documentary My Survival as an Aboriginal by Muruwari filmmaker and activist Essie Coffey.

=== Interactive experiences ===
==== The Lens ====
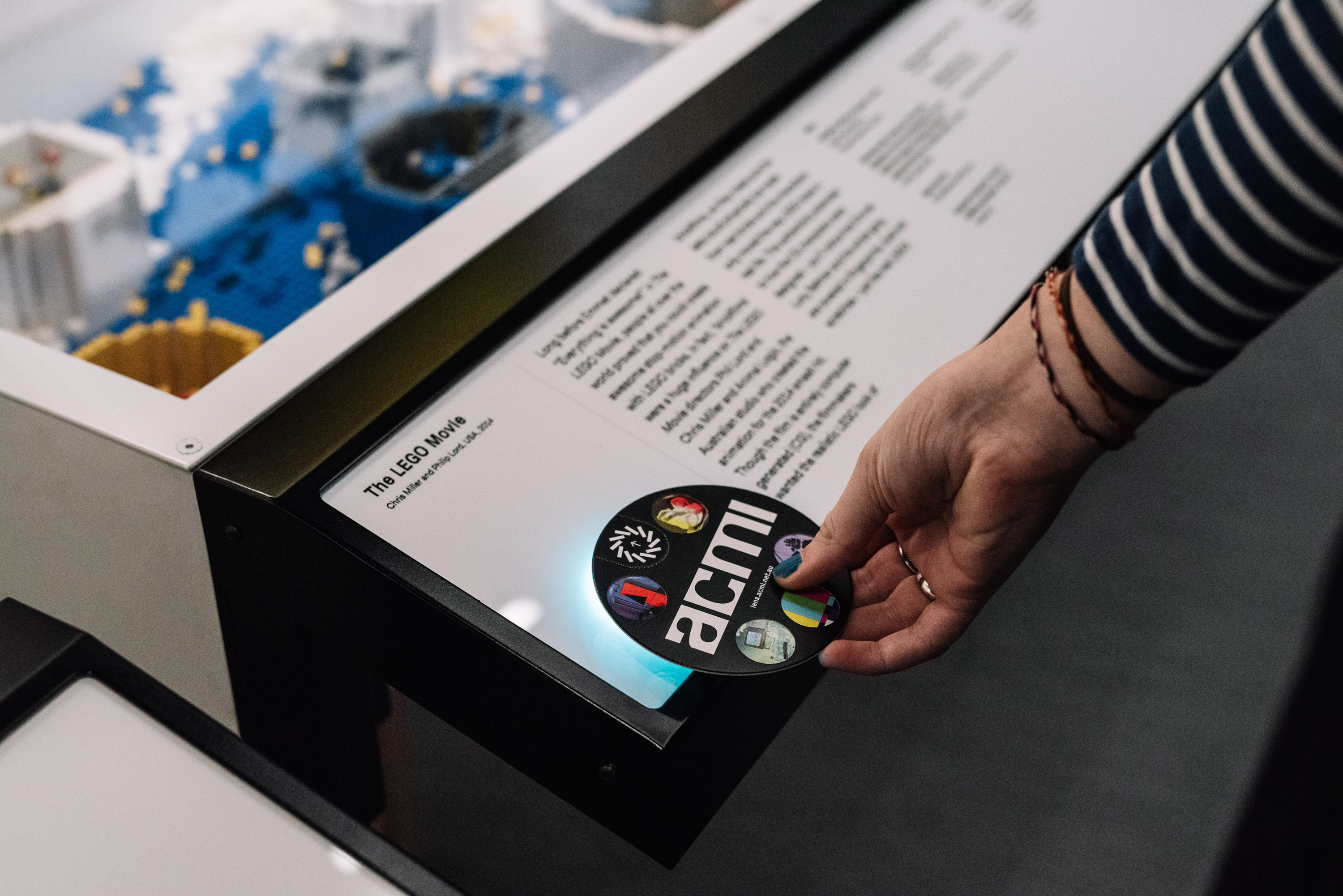
The Lens being tapped on a display in The Story of the Moving Image at ACMI (photo by Phoebe Powell)

The Lens is a handheld, take-home device that lets visitors collect artworks and objects throughout The Story of the Moving Image and other select exhibitions hosted at ACMI. Visitors can view their curated collections on the ACMI website and access additional content. The Lens was designed in collaboration with Second Story, Swinburne University’s Centre for Design Innovation and Lumicom.

===== Constellation =====
The Lens can be used at the Constellation, a room-scale experience located at the end of The Story of the Moving Image exhibition, consisting of six interactive touchscreen tables with an interface developed by Grumpy Sailor and a data visualisation designed by OOM Creative and More Studio. The Constellation takes the items collected by visitors on their Lens devices throughout the exhibition and connects them up to hundreds of other films, TV series, artworks and videogames beyond the scope of the gallery. Each recommendation is handpicked by ACMI's staff.

===== Edit Line =====
An approximation of physical film editing and digital editing on screen, Edit Line allows visitors to The Story of the Moving Image to rearrange physical storyboard blocks that each represent iconic quotes from films and television shows to trigger a clip played on a large screen. The resulting clip can be saved to the Lens and accessed online. Referenced screen works include major films such as Titanic, Blade Runner, and Star Wars: The Empire Strikes Back, and television shows such as The Simpsons, The Wire, and The X-Files. An accompanying essay has been published for each work on the ACMI website.

===== Foley Studio =====
Visitors can add sound effects to scenes from Round the Twist and Li'l Elvis and the Truckstoppers using unconventional objects typically used in the practice of Foley art. Videos produced can be saved to Lens devices and accessed online.

===== Memory Garden =====
An interactive and immersive display of digitised Australian home movies from the 1930s from the ACMI collection. Beams of light are projected from the ceiling that animate when visitors hold out their hands.

===== Shadow Play =====
An interactive experience in the Moving Pictures section of The Story of the Moving Image where visitors use their bodies to control virtual puppets projected in front of them.

== List of exhibitions at ACMI ==
=== Gallery 1 ===
Gallery 1 now houses the permanent exhibition The Story of the Moving Image which opened in 2021 following a renovation of the gallery. Gallery 1 is built along the entire length of what was previously Princes Bridge railway station. From 2002 to 2019 Gallery 1 was used for temporary exhibitions on the moving image such as video art, installations, interactive, sound art, net art and screen related objects were all regularly exhibited in this space.

Gallery 1 exhibitions 2002–19

Exhibition	Opened	Closed	Origin	Content Partner
Deep Space: Sensation & Immersion	26 October 2002	27 January 2003	Art Gallery of New South Wales as Space Odysseys: Sensation & Immersion	
Ngarinyin Pathways Dulwan	26 October 2002	31 August 2003	ACMI	Pathway Project of the Ngarinyin elders
Remembrance + the Moving Image Part I: Persistence of Vision	21 March 2003	25 May 2003	ACMI	
Remembrance + the Moving Image Part II: Reverberation	27 June 2003	31 August 2003	ACMI	
Transfigure	8 December 2003	9 May 2004	ACMI	
2004 Australian Culture Now	8 June 2004	12 September 2004	ACMI & National Gallery of Victoria	
SenseSurround	7 October 2004	7 November 2004	ACMI	
Proof	9 December 2004	13 February 2005	ACMI	
World Without End	14 April 2005	17 July 2005	ACMI	
White Noise	18 September 2005	23 October 2005	ACMI	
Stanley Kubrick	25 November 2005	29 January 2006	ACMI	
2006 Contemporary Commonwealth	24 February 2006	15 May 2006	ACMI	
TV50	22 June 2006	1 October 2006	ACMI	
Eyes, Lies and Illusions	2 November 2006	11 February 2007	Hayward Gallery	Werner Nekes Collection
Centre Pompidou Video Art 1965–2005	22 March 2007	27 May 2007	Centre Pompidou	
Pixar: 20 Years of Animation	28 June 2007	14 October 2007	Museum of Modern Art	Barbican Gallery
Christian Marclay	15 November 2007	3 February 2008	ACMI	
Game On	6 March 2008	13 July 2008	ACMI	
Correspondences: Victor Erice and Abbas Kiarostami	21 August 2008	2 November 2008	Centre de Cultura Contemporania de Barcelona	
Setting the Scene: Film Design from Metropolis to Australia	4 December 2008	19 April 2009	Deutsche Kinemathek as Moving Spaces	
Len Lye	16 July 2009	11 October 2009	ACMI	Govett-Brewster Art Gallery
Dennis Hopper & The New Hollywood	12 November 2009	25 April 2010	Cinematheque francaise	
Tim Burton: The Exhibition	24 June 2010	10 October 2010	Museum of Modern Art	
Dreams Come True: The Art of Disney's Classic Fairy Tales	18 November 2010	26 April 2011	New Orleans Museum of Art	Walt Disney Animation Research Library
Shaun Gladwell: Stereo Sequences	1 June 2011	14 August 2011	ACMI	
Star Voyager: Exploring Space on Screen	22 September 2011	29 January 2012	ACMI	
William Kentridge: Five Themes	8 March 2012	27 May 2012	San Francisco Museum of Modern Art	Norton Museum of Art
Game Masters	28 June 2012	28 October 2012	ACMI	
Candice Breitz: The Character	6 Dec 2012	11 March 2013	ACMI	
Hollywood Costume	24 April 2013	18 August 2013	Victoria & Albert Museum	
Spectacle: The Music Video Exhibition	26 September 2013	23 February 2014	Contemporary Arts Center	
DreamWorks Animation: The Exhibition	10 April 2014	5 October 2014	ACMI	DreamWorks Animation
Yang Fudong: Filmscapes	4 December 2014	15 March 2015	ACMI	Yang Fudong
David Bowie Is	16 July 2015	1 November 2015	Victoria & Albert Museum	
Julian Rosefeldt: Manifesto	9 December 2015	13 March 2016	ACMI	Julian Rosefeldt
SCORSESE	26 May 2016	18 September 2016	ACMI	Die Deutsche Kinemathek
Philippe Parreno: Thenabouts	6 December 2016	13 March 2017	ACMI	Philippe Parreno
Wallace & Gromit and Friends: The Magic of Aardman	29 June 2017	29 January 2018	ACMI	Aardman Animations
Wonderland	5 April 2018	7 October 2018	ACMI	
Christian Marclay: The Clock	23 January 2019	10 March 2019	ACMI	Christian Marclay

Gallery 1 exhibitions 2020 – present

Exhibition	Opened	Closed	Origin	Content Partner
The Story of the Moving Image	11 February 2021		ACMI	

=== Gallery 2 ===
Open from 18 September 2009, Gallery 2 is a smaller, more flexible gallery than Gallery 1.

Gallery 2 exhibitions 2009–19

Exhibition	Opened	Closed	Origin	Content Partner
Best of the Independent Games Festival 2009	8 December 2009	14 February 2010	ACMI	Independent Games Festival
Mary and Max: The Exhibition	2 March 2010	6 June 2010	ACMI	Adam Elliot
Bill Viola: The Raft	7 October 2010	20 February 2011	ACMI	Kaldor Public Arts Projects & Melbourne International Arts Festival
Arthur and Corinne Cantrill: Light Years	8 March 2011	5 June 2011	ACMI	
Julian Rosefeldt: American Night	21 June 2011	31 July 2011	Centro per l'Arte Contemporanea, Florence	
Margaret and David: 25 Years Talking Movies	17 August 2011	4 December 2011	ACMI	A collaboration with ABC. Supported by SBS.
Best of the Independent Games Festival 2011	20 December 2011	25 March 2012	ACMI	Independent Games Festival
Best of the Independent Games Festival 2012	27 March 2012	8 July 2012	ACMI	Independent Games Festival
Ian Burns: In the Telling	24 July 2012	20 January 2013	ACMI	Experimenta
Warwick Thornton: Mother Courage	5 February 2013	23 June 2013	dOCUMENTA (13)	
Shaun Tan's The Lost Thing: From book to film	16 July 2013	19 January 2014	ACMI	Shaun Tan, Passion Pictures Australia & Books Illustrated
Angelica Mesiti: The Calling	4 February 2014	13 July 2014	ACMI	A collaboration with the Ian Potter Cultural Trust
David Rosetzky: Gaps	5 August 2014	8 February 2015	ACMI	Carriageworks
War Pictures: Australians at the Cinema 1914–1918	10 March 2015	26 July 2015	ACMI	National Film and Sound Archive
Orry-Kelly: Dressing Hollywood	18 August 2015	17 January 2016	ACMI	A collaboration with the United States Consulate
Daniel Crooks: Phantom Ride	16 February 2016	29 May 2016	ACMI	A collaboration with the Ian Potter Cultural Trust
Del Kathryn Barton: The Nightingale and the Rose	5 June 2016	11 September 2016	ACMI	Del Kathryn Barton
Collisions	6 October 2016	15 January 2017	ACMI	Lynette Wallworth
Bombay Talkies	8 February 2017	2 July 2017	ACMI	Dietze Family Trust
Code Breakers: Women in Games	25 July 2017	5 November 2017	ACMI	
Eija-Liisa Ahtila: Studies on the Ecology of Drama	5 December 2017	25 February 2018	ACMI	Eija-Liisa Ahtila
TERROR NULLIUS	20 March 2018	1 July 2018	ACMI	Soda Jerk
Cleverman: The Exhibition	6 December 2018	22 April 2019	ACMI	Co-curated with Cleverman concept creator Ryan Griffen and Cleverman production designer Jacob Nash.

Gallery 2 exhibitions 2021 – present

Exhibition	Opened	Closed	Origin	Content Partner
Oskar Fischinger: Raumlichtkunst	11 February 2021	28 May 2023		Centre for Visual Music
Memo Akten: Distributed Consciousness	16 June 2023	31 July 2024		
Ayoung Kim – Delivery Dancer's Arc: 0° Receiver	22 August 2024	26 April 2026		

=== Gallery 3 ===
Open from 18 February 2021, Gallery 3 displays commissioned artworks and smaller exhibitions.

Gallery 3 exhibitions 2021 – present

Exhibition	Opened	Closed	Origin/Partner
Gabriella Hirst: Darling Darling	18 February 2021	9 June 2021	The Ian Potter Moving Image Commission
Deborah Kelly: The God of Tiny Things	1 July	14 November 2021	ACMI
Jason Phu: Analects of Kung Phu	2 December 2021	30 January 2022	Mordant Family Moving Image Commission for young Australian artists
Kaylene Whiskey: Ngura Pukulpa – Happy Place	21 February 2022	10 April 2022	ACMI + Melbourne Art Foundation
Gillian Wearing: Editing Life	29 April 2022	22 May 2022	PHOTO 2022 International Festival of Photography
Tully Arnot: Epiphytes	4 November 2022	27 November 2022	Mordant Family VR Commission
Out of Bounds: Exploring the Limits of Videogames	8 December 2022	23 April 2023	ACMI
Two Girls From Amoonguna	9 May 2023	20 Aug 2023	ACMI + Artbank Commission
Angela Tiatia: The Dark Current	5 Sep 2023	4 February 2024	Ian Potter Moving Image Commission
Stanislava Pinchuk: The Theatre of War	19 February 2024	10 June 2024	ACMI + The Mordant Family Moving Image Commission for Young Australian Artists + City of Melbourne
Beneath Roads	25 June 2024	25 August 2024	ACMI
Honk! Untitled Goose Exhibition	17 September 2024	16 February 2025	ACMI + House House
Serwah Attafuah: The Darkness Between the Stars	11 March 2025	1 June 2025	ACMI + The Mordant Family Moving Image Commission for Young Australian Artists
CHARGE! Agincourt by Back to Back Theatre	17 June 2025	1 February 2026	ACMI

=== Gallery 4 ===
Open from 18 February 2021, Gallery 4 hosts larger exhibitions and Melbourne Winter Masterpieces.

Exhibition	Opened	Closed	Origin
Disney: The Magic of Animation	13 May 2021	23 January 2022	Walt Disney Animation Research Library
Reko Rennie: What Do We Want?	1 April 2022	1 May 2022	ACMI
Light: Works from Tate's Collection	16 June 2022	13 November 2022	Tate
How I See It: Blak Art and Film	16 December 2022	19 February 2023	ACMI
Goddess: Power, Glamour, Rebellion	5 April 2023	1 October 2023	ACMI
Marshmallow Laser Feast: Works of Nature	23 November 2023	14 April 2024	Marshmallow Laser Feast
Beings	22 May 2024	6 October 2024	Contained current and never-before-seen artworks by Universal Everything
The Future & Other Fictions	28 November 2024	27 April 2025	ACMI
Game Worlds	18 September 2025	29 March 2026	Multiple video game companies

=== Gallery 5 ===
Launched in October 2020, Gallery 5 is an online space for virtual exhibitions and performance, and a commissioning space for practitioners making art that interrogates Internet and digital culture.

Exhibition	Opened	Closed	Origin
Lu Yang: Delusional World	11 November 2020		
Matthew Griffin: content	17 December 2020	1 May 2021	
Ross Gibson: head_phone_film_poems	10 June 2021		
Unfinished Camp	24 September 2021	19 December 2021	
Laura Duffy: Spawn	1 December 2021	6 March 2022	
Firepit Collective: HYPER//ECHO	3 April 2022	1 July 2022	
Xanthe Dobbie: The Long Now	11 July 2022		
APHIDS: FAWN	11 October 2022		
Daniel Jenatsch: The Close World – The Building	18 January 2023		
Olivia Koh: Minyak Sawit Keluarga (Palm Oil Family)	1 September 2023		
Emile Zile: We Are As Gods	1 November 2023		

== Programs ==
=== Film programs ===
ACMI's year-round film program celebrates local and international cinema. ACMI has two main cinemas located on Level 2 of the museum, which were the first cinemas in Australia equipped to present Digital Cinema (DCP). Today the cinemas continue to be equipped to screen analog formats including 16mm film, 35mm film, HDCAM, Digital Betacam and SP Betacam. Cinema 1 seats 168 and Cinema 2 seats 390.

ACMI's ongoing film programs include:

- Matinees – Narrative features, classic Hollywood and arthouse restorations, documentaries, musicals and more.
- Big Screen Premieres – Working in partnership with streaming services, including Binge, Apple TV+, Netflix, and SBS on Demand, ACMI screens episodes of TV series in its cinemas. For ACMI Members only.

Past programs include:

- Australian Perspectives – Contemporary Australian filmmaking with archival classics and special guest presentations.
- Family films – Regular screenings and school holiday film programs for families.

ACMI profiles actors, directors, writers, cinematographers, and film genres through its retrospective seasons and screenings. Highlights have included seasons on Wong Kar-wai, Agnès Varda, Abbas Kiarostami, Dario Argento, William Klein, John Cassavetes, and Jim Henson. Genres have included Ozploitation; Zombie Horror; East German Cinema; and Monsters, Ghouls and Melancholy Misfits in conjunction with the Tim Burton exhibition.

=== Public programs ===
ACMI programs events to industry, practitioners and the broader public through talks and workshops in person and online. Regular public programs include ACMI + RMIT Audience Lab, Women & Non-Binary Gamers Club, First Nations Film Club, and workshops for families during the school holidays.

=== Festivals ===
Film festivals and events hosted at ACMI's venues are a core part of ACMI's cinema programs.

==== Current festival partners ====
- Australian International Documentary Conference (AIDC)
- Birrarangga Film Festival (BFF)
- Cinemaniacs
- Czech and Slovak Film Festival (CasFFA)
- Environmental Film Festival Australia (EFFA)
- Human Rights Arts & Film Festival (HRAFF)
- Indonesian Film Festival (IFF)
- Japanese Film Festival (JFF)
- Korean Film Festival Australia (KOFFIA)
- Melbourne Cinémathèque
- Melbourne International Animation Festival (MIAF)
- Melbourne International Comedy Festival (MICF)
- Melbourne International Film Festival (MIFF)
- Melbourne Queer Film Festival (MQFF)
- Melbourne Women in Film Festival (MWFF)
- VCAA Top Screen

== Collections and preservation ==
The ACMI Collection contains over 250,000 items including film, ephemera, objects, videogames and time-based media art. It began in 1947 as the State Film Centre collection allowing Victorians to access film for education purposes. Since becoming part of ACMI it has diversified to include all forms of the moving image. ACMI works collaboratively both nationally and internationally with organisations including the National Film and Sound Archive (NFSA), the Internet Archive, MoMa, Tate, Swinburne University, RMIT University, the Grimwade Centre for Cultural Materials Conservation, and private collectors.

Many digitised items in the ACMI Collection are accessible to the public via the ACMI website or ACMI Collection YouTube channel.

=== Blackmagic Design Media Preservation Lab ===
Located at ACMI, Fed Square on Level 1, the Blackmagic Design Media Preservation Lab is a publicly visible space where ACMI's Collection team can be viewed undertaking digital preservation, digitisation and time-based media (TBM) conservation activities.

The Lab is supported by Blackmagic Design, and was designed in collaboration with BKK Architects and Second Story.

== Education ==
ACMI's education program provides schools and teachers with exhibition visits, workshops, film programs, talks, online programs, professional development opportunities, free learning resources and recorded lectures.

== Touring ==
ACMI has expanded its touring program over the past decade. Beginning with Mary and Max, which toured regional Victoria, ACMI then followed by showing the 2011 Best of the Independent Games Festival in Sydney and Brisbane; Shaun Tan's The Lost Thing: From Book To Film and War Pictures: Australians at the Cinema 1914–1918; and ACMI's first original exhibition in the Melbourne Winter Masterpieces series, Game Masters: The Exhibition.

=== Touring exhibitions ===
==== Two Girls from Amoonguna ====
- Yarra Ranges Regional Museum, Lilydale, VIC (16 Dec 2023 – 28 Mar 2024)
- Yarrawarra Aboriginal Cultural Centre, Corindi Beach, NSW (11 Apr – 2 Jun 2024)
- Museum of Art and Culture, Booragul, NSW (10 Aug – 13 Oct 2024)
- Araluen Arts Centre, Alice Springs, NT (1 Nov 2024 – 27 Jan 2025)
- Hyphen Wodonga, Wodonga, VIC (14 Feb – 11 May 2025)
- Tamworth Regional Gallery, Tamworth, NSW (14 Jun – 24 Aug 2025)
- Riddoch Arts and Cultural Centre, Mount Gambier, SA (6 Sep – 26 Oct 2025)
- Redcliffe Art Gallery, QLD (29 Nov 2025 – 8 Feb 2026)
- Gladstone Regional Gallery, QLD (14 Feb – 25 Apr 2026)
- Salt Water Gallery, WA (8 May – 21 Jun 2026)

==== Between the Details: Video Art from the ACMI Collection ====
- Benalla Art Gallery, Benalla, VIC (9 December – 26 February 2023)
- Warrnambool Art Gallery, Warrnambool, VIC (11 March – 11 June 2023)
- Western Sydney University, Sydney, NSW (24 July – 08 October 2023)
- Manningham Art Gallery, Melbourne, VIC (21 October – 04 February 2024)
- Flinders University Museum of Art, Adelaide, SA (19 February – 19 April 2024)
- Mildura Arts Centre, Mildura, VIC (11 May – 04 August 2024)
- Rockhampton Museum of Art, Rockhampton, QLD (21 September – 24 November 2024)
- Pinnacles Gallery, Townsville, QLD (07 December – 23 February 2025)
- ArtSpace at Realm, Melbourne, VIC (24 March – 18 May 2025)
- Maitland Regional Art Gallery, Maitland, NSW (05 July – 12 Oct 2025)

Marshmallow Laser Feast: Works of Nature

How I See It: Blak Art and Film

=== Previously Toured ===
==== Wonderland ====
- Art Science Museum, Singapore (13 Apr – 22 Sept 2019)
- Te Papa, Wellington, New Zealand (7 Dec 2019 – 8 Mar 2020)
- WA Museum Boola Bardip, Perth, Australia (17 Dec 2022 – 23 Apr 2023)

==== DreamWorks Animation: The Exhibition – Journey from sketch to screen ====
Sources:

- ArtScience Museum, Singapore (13 June – 27 Sept 2015)
- Te Papa Tongarewa, Wellington, New Zealand (12 Dec 2015 – 28 Mar 2016)
- Seoul Museum of Art, Seoul, South Korea (30 April – 15 Aug 2016)
- National Taiwan Science and Education Centre, Taipei, Taiwan (29 Oct 2016 – 5 Feb 2017)
- Museo de Arte Contemporáneo de Monterrey, Monterrey, Mexico (6 Apr – 6 Aug 2017)
- Canadian Museum of History, Ottawa, Canada (7 Dec 2017 – 8 Apr 2018)
- Montreal Science Centre, Montreal, Canada (9 May – 16 Sept 2018) [112]
- Centro Cultural Banco do Brasil, Rio de Janeiro, Brazil (5 Feb – 15 Apr 2019)
- Centro Cultural Banco do Brasil, Belo Horizonte, Brazil (14 May – 29 Jul 2019)
- National Museum of Australia, Canberra Australia (12 Sept 2019 – 2 Feb 2020)
- Northwest Museum of Art and Culture, Spokane, USA (26 Mar – 11 Sep 2022)
- Dom Cultural, São Paulo, Brazil (11 Mar – 28 Aug 2023

==== Cleverman ====
- The Riddoch & Main Corner Complex, Mount Gambier, SA (14 Mar – 6 September 2020)
- Caboolture Regional Art Gallery, Moreton Bay, QLD (25 Sept – 6 Dec 2020)
- Yarrawarra Aboriginal Cultural Centre, Corindi, NSW (19 Dec 2020 – 11 Apr 2021)
- Gosford Regional Gallery, Gosford, NSW (22 May – 11 Jul 2021)
- Orange Regional Museum, Orange, NSW (24 Jul – 24 Oct 2021)
- Murray Bridge Regional Gallery, Murray Bridge, SA (11 Dec 2021 – 30 Jan 2022)
- Museum of the Riverina, Wagga Wagga, NSW (5 Mar – 29 May 2022)
- Museum of the Great Southern, Albany, WA (12 Jun – 9 Oct 2022)
- Museum of Geraldton, Geraldton, WA (3 Dec 2022 – 23 Apr 2023)
- Museum of the Goldfields, Kalgoorlie, WA (6 May – 10 Sept 2023)

Code Breakers: Women in Games

- Manningham Art Gallery, Melbourne, VIC (4 April – 12 May 2018)
- Warrnambool Art Gallery, Warrnambool, VIC (21 July – 14 Oct 2018)
- Latrobe Regional Gallery, Morwell, VIC (27 Oct 2018 – 27 Jan 2019)
- Swan Hill Regional Gallery, Swan Hill, VIC (8 Feb – 24 Mar 2019)
- East Gippsland Art Gallery, Sale, VIC (4 April – 19 May 2019)
- Discovery Science and Technology Centre, Bendigo VIC (10 Oct 2019 – 13 Apr 2020)
- Orange Regional Gallery, NSW (8 Aug – 14 Oct 2020)
- The Workshops Rail Museum, Ipswich, QLD (24 Oct 2020 – 2 May 2021)
- Cobb & Co Museum, Toowoomba, QLD (8 May – 8 Aug 2021)
- Yarra Ranges Regional Museum, Lilydale, VIC (5 March – 15 May 2022)
- OTAGO Museum, Dunedin, New Zealand (2 July −30 Oct 2022)
- MOTAT, Auckland, New Zealand (2 Dec 2022 – 26 March 2023)

==== Game Masters ====
- Museum of New Zealand Te Papa Tongarewa, Wellington, New Zealand (15 Dec 2012 – 28 Apr 2013)
- Powerhouse Museum, Sydney, Australia (13 Dec 2013 – 25 May 2014)
- National Museum of Scotland, Edinburgh, Scotland (5 Dec 2014 – 20 Apr 2015)
- Halmstad Arena, Halmstad, Sweden (28 May – 31 Aug 2015)
- Oregon Museum of Science and Industry, Portland, USA (13 Feb – 8 May 2016)
- Center of Science and Industry, Columbus, USA (10 June – 5 Sept 2016)
- Museum für Kunst und Gewerbe, Hamburg, Germany (14 Nov 2016 – 23 Apr 2017)
- Fleet Science Center, San Diego, USA (1 Jul 2017 – 15 Jan 2018)
- The Franklin Institute, Philadelphia, USA (31 Mar – 3 Sept 2018)
- Science Museum of Minnesota, St Paul, USA (15 Feb – 5 May 2019)
- National Film and Sound Archive, Canberra, Australia (27 Sept 2019 – 9 Mar 2020)

==== Del Kathryn Barton: The Nightingale and the Rose ====
- Swan Hill Regional Gallery, Swan Hill, VIC (1 Dec 2017 – 28 Jan 2018)
- Cairns Art Gallery, Cairns, QLD (16 Feb – 22 Apr 2018)
- Rockhampton Art Gallery, Rockhampton, QLD (16 Jun – 5 Aug 2018)
- Horsham Regional Art Gallery (18 Aug – 7 Oct 2018)
- Yarra Ranges Regional Museum, Lilydale, VIC (20 Oct 2018 – 3 Feb 2019)
- Devonport Regional Gallery, Devonport, TAS (16 Mar – 26 May 2019)
- Maitland Regional Art Gallery, Maitland, NSW (27 Jul – 3 Nov 2019)
- Wagga Wagga Art Gallery, Wagga Wagga, NSW (16 Nov 2019 – 26 Jan 2020)
- New England Regional Art Gallery, Armidale, NSW (7 Feb – 5 July 2020)

==== War Pictures: Australians at the Cinema 1914–1918 ====
- Benalla Art Gallery, Benalla, VIC (29 Apr – 16 Jun 2016)
- Warrnambool Art Gallery, Warrnambool, VIC (10 Sept – 13 Nov 2016)
- Central Goldfields Art Gallery, Maryborough, VIC (29 Mar – 6 May 2018)

==== Shaun Tan's The Lost Thing: From Book to Film ====
- Redcliffe City Art Gallery, Moreton Bay, QLD (28 Feb – 20 May 2015)
- Perc Tucker Regional Gallery, Townsville, QLD (5 May – 2 July 2015)
- Rockhampton Art Gallery, Rockhampton, QLD (30 May – 12 Jul 2015)
- Bundaberg Regional Art Gallery, Bundaberg, QLD (14 Aug – 11 Oct 2015)
- Yarra Ranges Regional Museum, Lilydale, VIC (28 Nov – 14 Feb 2016)
- Maitland Regional Art Gallery, Maitland, NSW (5 Mar – 24 Apr 2016)
- New England Regional Art Museum, Armidale, NSW (6 May – 24 Jul 2016)
- Bunbury Regional Art Galleries, Bunbury, WA (6 Aug – 25 Sept 2016)
- Geraldton Regional Art Gallery, Geraldton, WA (7 Oct – 26 Nov 2016)
- Albury Library Museum, Albury, NSW (10 Dec 2016 – 22 Jan 2017)
- Cairns Art Gallery, Cairns, QLD (4 Feb – 16 April 2017)

==== Mary and Max: The Exhibition ====
- Geelong Art Gallery, Geelong, VIC (27 Nov 2010 – 13 Feb 2011)
- Gippsland Art Gallery, Sale, VIC (5 Mar – 8 May 2011)
- Warrnambool Art Gallery, Warrnambool, VIC (3 Dec 2011 – 29 Jan 2012)

== Online content and programming ==
ACMI has a strong online presence, with regular updates being made to the ACMI website and its accounts on social media platforms – Facebook, Instagram, LinkedIn and Twitter.

=== YouTube ===
ACMI's main YouTube channel publishes recorded talks, interviews with artists, season trailers, screen culture essays and behind-the-scenes videos.

The ACMI Collection channel provides access to digitised works such as home videos, promotional and educational films, and stories from original analogue formats, including film or tape.

The ACMI Education channel publishes explainer videos, educational resources and films produced by students.

=== Cinema 3 ===
ACMI's on-demand rental platform features new release films, classics and revivals curated by ACMI's programmers.

=== Gallery 5 ===
Launched in October 2020, Gallery 5 is an online space for virtual exhibitions and performance, and a commissioning space for practitioners making art that interrogates Internet and digital culture. Commissioned artists include Lu Yang, Matthew Griffin, Ross Gibson, Jazz Money, Moorina Bonini, Kalanjay Dhir, Laura Duffy, Firepit Collective, Xanthe Dobbie, APHIDS, Daniel Jenatsch, Oliviah Koh and Emile Zile.

=== Stories & Ideas ===
ACMI publishes essays, interviews, recorded talks, behind-the-scenes videos, topical articles and recommendations related to film, television, videogames and digital art on its website. Content is produced by ACMI staff and external writers.

=== The Story of the Moving Image Online ===
An abridged online version of ACMI's centrepiece exhibition, The Story of the Moving Image, was launched in October 2020.The Story of the Moving Image Online is presented in six parts: Australian Television, Australian Film, Videogames, Blak Women on Screen, Social Video and Digital Art.

== ACMI Publications ==
- World Without End (2005)
- 2006: Contemporary Commonwealth (2006) / Edited by Charles Green
- Look both ways: daylight reverie (2007) / Gary Simmons
- Setting The Scene: Film Design From Metropolis To Australia (2008)
- Dennis Hopper & The New Hollywood (2009)
- Star Voyager: Exploring Space On Screen (2011)
- Shaun Gladwell: Stereo Sequences (2011)
- The Woods: Candice Breitz (2012)
- Game Masters: The Exhibition (2012)
- Wonderland (2017)
- The story of the moving image (2022) / edited by Matt Millikan and Sarah Tutton
- Light: Works from Tate's Collection (2022) / edited by Kerryn Greenberg
- How I See It: Blak Art & Film (2022) /
- Goddess: Fierce Women On Film (2023) / by Bethan Lloyd Johnson and Matt Millikan

== Commercial operations ==
=== ACMI Shop ===
ACMI's gift shop stocks books, curios, gifts, ACMI publications and merchandise related to screen culture. The shop collaborates with local artists to produce exclusive ranges and sustainably sourced products, and stocks exclusive merchandise designed by ACMI's in-house design team.

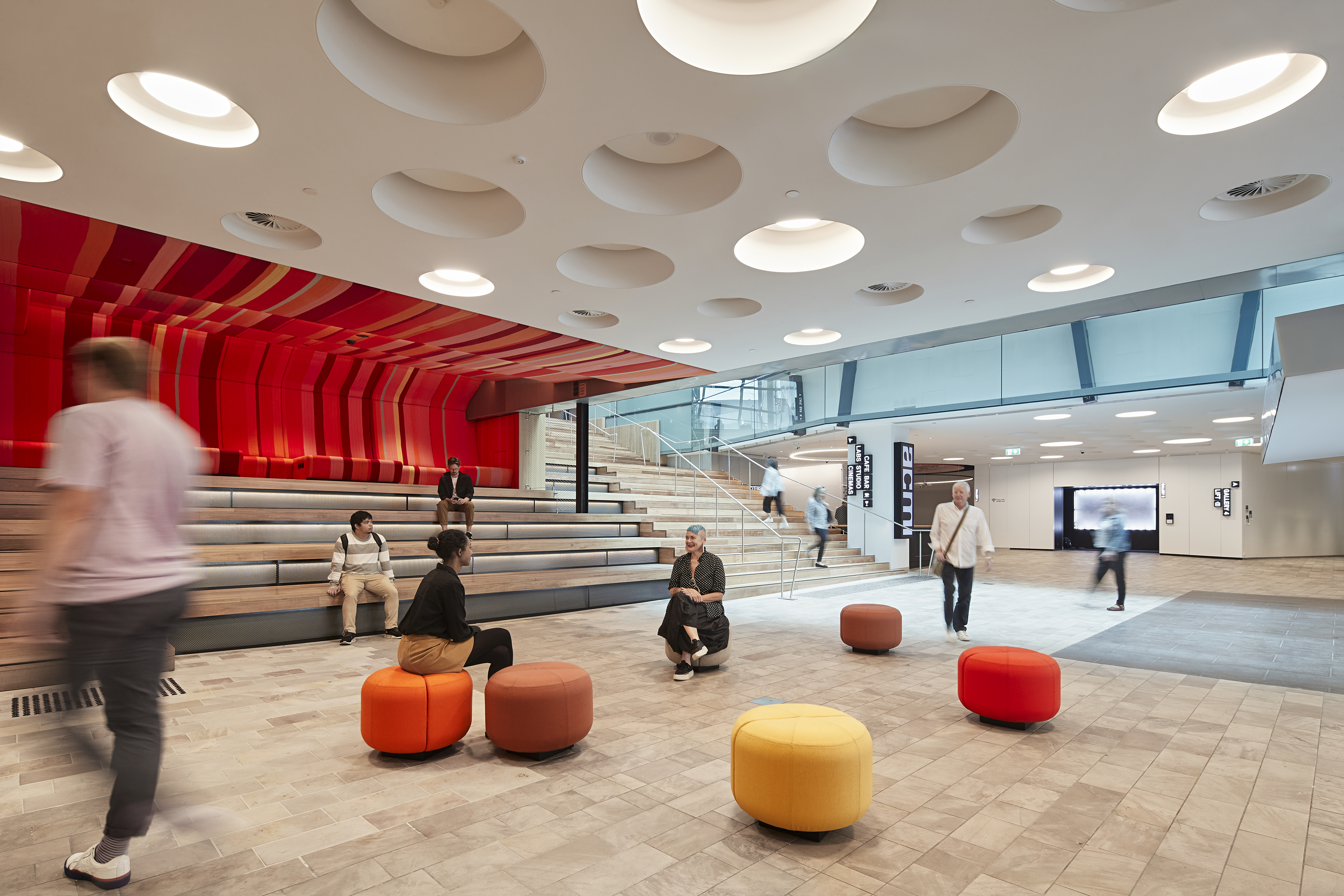
The Lightwell foyer space at the Flinders Street Entrance of ACMI, Fed Square (photo by Shannon McGrath)

=== Event spaces ===
- The Story of the Moving Image – capacity: 450 standing
- Lightwell – capacity: 450 standing
- Underground Gallery (Gallery 4) – capacity: 700 standing
- Swinburne Studio – capacity: 150 seated, 200 standing. The Swinburne Studio is supported by ACMI's Major Academic Partner Swinburne University of Technology.
- Gandel Digital Future Lab 1 – capacity: 50 seated, 90 standing. The Gandel Digital Future Lab 1 is supported by ACMI's Major Philanthropic Partner The Gandel Family.
- Boardroom – capacity: 30 seated
- ACMI Cinemas – Cinema 1 capacity: 390 seated. Cinema 3 capacity: 168 seated.

=== Hero (closed) ===
Located in Fed Square, ACMI's restaurant, bar and café Hero featured a menu developed by Melbourne chef, restaurateur, writer and television presenter Karen Martini. Hero's menu was described as "European-focused", "seasonal" and "uncomplicated cooking packed with flavour that celebrates local Victorian produce".

Hero was designed by Melbourne-based architecture and interior design studio Chris Connell Design, drawing on aesthetic inspiration from the 1967 film PlayTime by French filmmaker Jacques Tati. Hero was operated by HospitalityM, a venture founded by Michael Gebran.

Hero closed in October 2023.

== Industry partnerships and co-working ==
=== ACMI X ===
The ACMI X Industry Residency program provides an office space, resources and networking opportunities for Melbourne-based creative practitioners, startups and businesses working across film, TV, videogames and art.

ACMI X is located on Level 2 at ACMI, Fed Square, and was previously located in Southbank, Melbourne.

=== CEO Digital Mentoring Program ===
ACMI, in conjunction with the Australia Council's national Cultural Digital Program, runs a mentoring initiative for strategic technology and digital mentoring for CEOs and Directors of cultural organisations. The program is supported by the Ian Potter Foundation.

=== ACMI + RMIT Audience Lab ===
ACMI and RMIT invites game developers, filmmakers, moving image artists, technologists and individual creators to show their products and works at ACMI and gather audience feedback. Previous projects tested out at past Audience Labs include Untitled Goose Game and The Gardens Between.

=== ACMI + RMIT Games Prize ===
The ACMI + RMIT Games Prize is awarded to a graduating student from the RMIT Bachelor of Design (Games) for a work exploring the artistic potential of the medium.

==== Previous winners ====
- 2021–22: Caleb Noller and Sarah Carlton, Sussurus
- 2020–21: Daniel Ferguson, Completely Stretchy and Uncomfortably Sticky
- 2019–20: David Chen, Spiritwell

=== ACMI + MESS partnership ===
ACMI's partnership with Melbourne Electronic Sound Studio (MESS) saw four artists commissioned to create immersive, experimental and atmospheric sound compositions for ACMI's cinema trailers. The commissioned artists were Chiara Kickdrum, Sara Retallick, Sabine Brix and Tyler Wilay.

=== Foundry658 ===
Foundry658 was an initiative of the Victorian Government’s Creative State strategy delivered by ACMI and State Library Victoria. Foundry658 supported independent artists, small arts organisations, not-for-profits, commercial creative enterprises, early-stage entrepreneurs and creative industries practitioners to transform their ideas into sustainable businesses.

=== ACMI Xcel Accelerator ===
Launched in 2018 in partnership with LaunchVic, ACMI X offered a business accelerator program that gave creative technology practitioners access to ACMI's audience to test, refine and promote their ideas, and to showcase outcomes to industry, investor and international audiences.

== Awards ==
=== Renewal Awards ===
Australian Institute of Architects’ 2021 Victorian Architecture Awards

- Winner (Interior Architecture) BKK & ACMI

Melbourne Design Awards 2021

- Gold Winner (Interior Design Public or Institutional) BKK & ACMI

Good Design Awards 2021

- Winner (Architectural Design Urban Design and Public Spaces)
- Winner (Design Research)

Idea Awards 2021

- Shortlist: Public Space – ACMI renewal

Victorian Lighting Award

- Winner: Award of Excellence

Victorian Premier Award 2021

- Highly Commended

=== Awards for The Story of the Moving Image ===
MAGNA (Museums & Galleries Awards)

- Highly Commended (Story of the Moving Image, Large Organisations Category)

Good Design Awards 2021

- Gold Winner (with Grumpy Sailor & Second Story in the ‘Digital Interface’ category for the Constellation)

SEGD Global Design Awards 2022

- Merit Award
- Honour award for the digital interactive experiences in The Story of the Moving Image

=== Brand Awards ===
MAPDA (Museums & Galleries Awards)

- Winner (Identity, Large organisations Category) North & ACMI

Creative Review Magazine

- Honourable Mention (Identity) North & ACMI

Design Week (UK)

- Highly Commended (Identity rebrand) North

Monotype Type Champions 2020

- Winner: ACMI

Brand New Awards

- Winner: #1 Project of the Year

Taiwan International Graphic Design Awards 2021

- Corporate Identity Category, Distinction

=== Website and Post-visit Awards ===
MAPDA (Museums & Galleries Awards)

- Winner (Website, Large organisations Category)
- Highly Commended (Virtual Tour, Large organisations Category)

=== Awards for Hero – Design ===
INDE.Awards 2021

- Winner Hero/Chris Connell (Best Social Space)

The Australian Interior Design Awards 2021

- Commendation: Hospitality Design, Chris Connell Design for Hero ACMI

Dulux Colour Awards 2021

- Finalist: Commercial Interior, Public and Hospitality

Eat Drink Design Awards 2021

- Shortlist: Best Restaurant Design, Chris Connell Design, Hero ACMI

Idea Awards 2021

- Shortlist: Hospitality, Chris Connell Design, Hero ACMI

=== Awards for Hero – Food ===
Melbourne Awards 2021

- Finalist: Hospitality, Hero

Good Food Guide Victoria 2022

- One Hat: Hero

== Former attractions ==
=== Screen Worlds ===
Open from 18 September 2009, Screen Worlds was an evolving permanent exhibition exploring all aspects of the moving image using objects, footage and artistic installations. Screen Worlds explored the story of the moving image through a number of different sections – Emergence, Voices, Sensation, Games Lab and Kids Space.

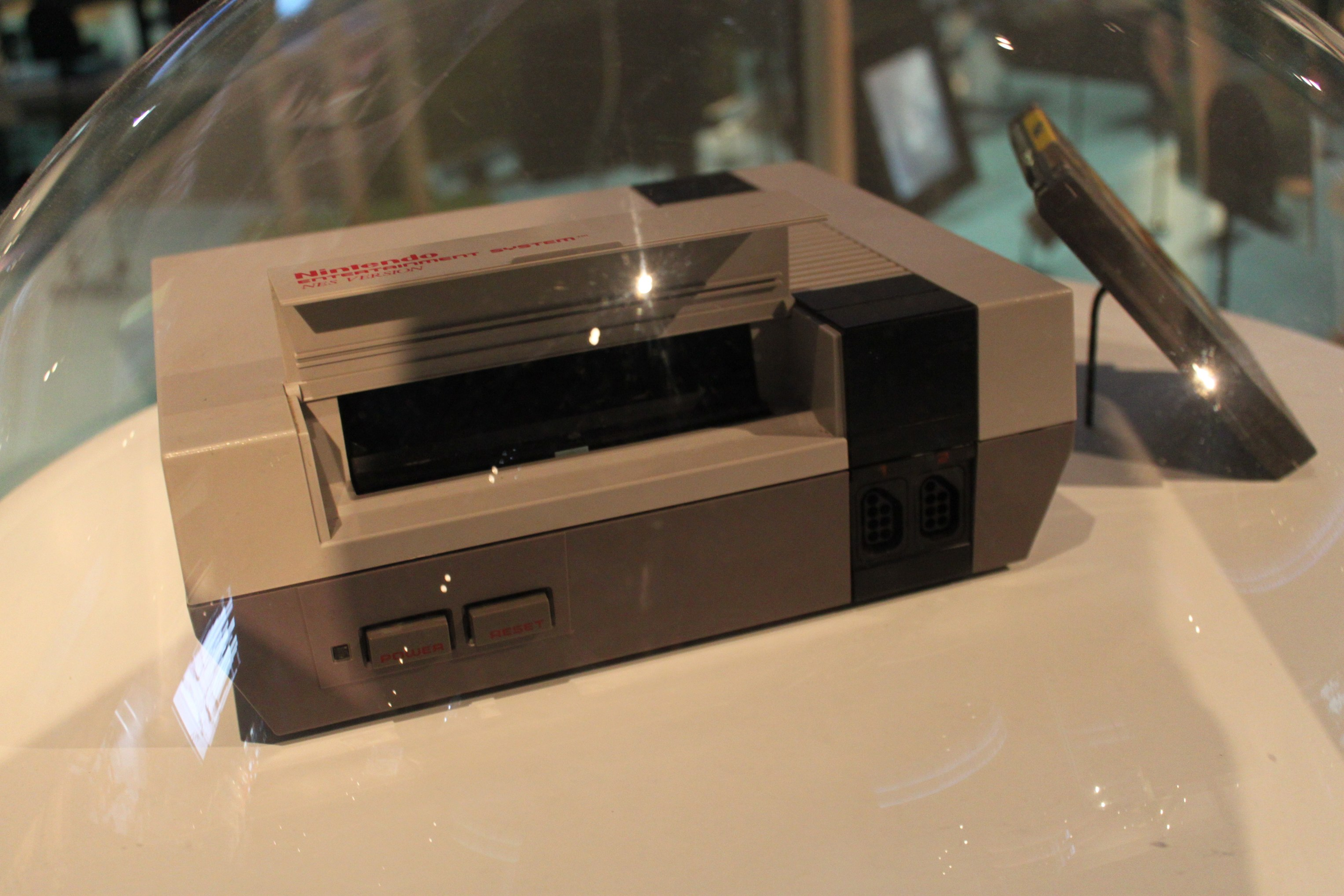
Some of the games on display in Screen Worlds.

The Screen Worlds exhibition hosted a number of 'Immersive Experiences'(interactive displays), including Timeslice (inspired by The Matrix), Ty the Tasmanian Tiger Zoetrope, The Faulty Fandangle (created by Oscar®-nominated Anthony Lucas), an installation by Anthony McCall, and many more.

Screen Worlds closed on 22 April 2019 to allow for redevelopment.

=== Video Garden ===
The Video Garden was an outdoor gallery that led people from the Flinders Street side of the building to the main entrance. Exhibitions included Random Encounters, Gooey by the Lycette Bros, and Blast Off.

=== Memory Grid ===
The Memory Grid was a display allowing access to over 100 hours of film that were recorded by ordinary Australians, independent filmmakers, students, community-based practitioners and participants in ACMI hands-on production workshops. Much of the content in the Memory Grid had either never been displayed outside, or had been displayed only once on community television. Further, the Memory Grid contained a large collection of animated and interactive works, and actively accepted work from the public for display.

=== Australian Mediatheque ===
Australian Mediatheque, coordinated by ACMI and the National Film and Sound Archive (NFSA) was a multiple screen station with access to works from ACMI and the NFSA. Admission was free. The Australian Mediatheque closed permanently in September 2017.

=== Screen It ===
Screen It was an annual filmmaking competition for primary and secondary school students, hosted by ACMI. Screen It had 6 categories: Primary Live Action, Primary Animation, Primary Videogame, Secondary Live Action, Secondary Animation and Secondary Videogame. Each year there was a theme; past themes included Change (2015) and Reflection (2014). At the end of the year, there was a Red Carpet Awards Gala for the finalists in which they announced winners and the next year's theme. The competition was cancelled after 2019's event, with ACMI citing a "[transformation] into a brand new global museum".

=== Games Lab ===
The Games Lab was ACMI's display area for interactive videogames. It celebrated the past, present and future of games and promoted this popular form of the moving image as a reflection of Australian culture.

In 2003, ACMI commissioned an interactive game-based, site specific installation called acmipark, which was exhibited in the Games Lab. acmipark replicated and abstracted the real world architecture of Federation Square. It also housed highly innovative mechanisms for interactive, multiplayer sound and musical composition.

The Games Lab exhibited the Best of the Independent Games Festival for 2005, 2006 and 2007. In early 2007, Hits of the 80s profiled Melbourne's Beam Software and the secret history of Australia's place in the rise and rise of the videogame. In 2005 an exhibition was dedicated to Sonic the Hedgehog called Sonic the Hedgehog: Icon of our Times.

The Games Lab was incorporated into the Screen Worlds exhibition space.
