= Anglican Diocese of Guinea =

The Anglican Diocese of Guinea is one of 17 dioceses in the Church of the Province of West Africa and comprises the nation of Guinea. It was created in 1985 by the partition of the Diocese of Gambia and Guinea into the English-speaking Diocese of Gambia and the French-speaking Diocese of Guinea.

== History ==
The first Christian mission in the area was sponsored by the Church Mission Society in 1806, but the two missionaries who were sent succumbed to the unhealthy climate. A second attempt in 1855 by missionaries from Barbados was more successful; the Reverend James Humble Leacock landed with a lay assistant, John Duport, and in 1856 built the first church, St. James, in Fallanjhia in the Rio Pongas area. Although Leacock died that year, Duport was later ordained by the Bishop of Sierra Leone.

The Diocese of Gambia and Guinea was created in 1935. In 1951, it was one of the five dioceses (the others being Accra, Lagos, Niger and Sierra Leone) which together formed the new Province of West Africa. (The five provinces have since grown to the current 17 by a process of subdivision, mainly in Ghana.) Jean Rigal Elisée, the last of five bishops of the diocese, proposed that it be split up, and on 1 August 1985, the Francophone Diocese of Guinea was created. Thomas Willy Makole, a Guinean, became its first bishop, though he died the following year. Elisée became the bishop of the Anglophone Diocese of Gambia. Jacques Boston became the third Guinean bishop of the diocese in 2013, succeeding Albert Gomez.

== Churches and congregations as of 2005 ==
The cathedral church of the diocese is the Cathedral of All Saints in Conakry. There are an additional three churches and also ten congregations.

== List of bishops ==
Diocese of Gambia and Guinea

- 1935–1951 John Charles Sydney Daly
- 1951–1957 Roderic Norman Coote
- 1958–1963 St Surridge John Pike
- 1965–1971 Timothy Omotayo Olufosoye (Primate of the Anglican Church of Nigeria, 1979–86)
- 1972–1985 Jean Rigal Elisée

Diocese of Guinea

- 1985–1986 Thomas Willy Makole (Willy Thomas Yaneh Maccauley)
- 2000-2011 Albert David Guillaume Gomez
- 2013–present Jacques Boston

Following Makole's demise, the diocese was administered successively by:

- George Brown (Archbishop of West Africa)
- Prince Eustace Shokellu Thompson (died 1994) (Anglican Bishop of Freetown)
- Robert Garshong Allotey Okine (Archbishop of West Africa)
