= Élisée =

Élisée or Elisée is a masculine given name of French origin which may refer to:

- Élisée Dionne (1828–1892), Canadian politician
- Élisée Maclet (1881–1962), French Impressionist painter
- Élisée Reclus (1830–1905), French geographer, writer and anarchist
- Elisée Reverchon (1834–1914), French botanical collector
- Eliseé Sou (born 1999), Burkinabé footballer
- Élisée Thériault (1884–1958), Canadian lawyer and politician in Quebec

== See also ==
- Élysée (disambiguation)
