= MWM =

MWM may refer to:

- MWM (entertainment company), Madison Wells Media, an entertainment company in Los Angeles
- Megan Wants a Millionaire, VH1 reality show starring Megan Hauseman
- Melbourne Winter Masterpieces, an annual series of major exhibitions held in Melbourne
- Million Worker March, a pro-labor demonstration in Washington, D.C.
- Million Woman March, a black women's demonstration in Philadelphia, Pennsylvania in 1997
- Metrowagonmash, a Russian company producing metro cars and other rolling stock
- Motif Window Manager, a window manager for the X Window System based on the Motif toolkit
- MWM (Motoren Werke Mannheim AG) a German company specializing in the manufacturing of Diesel engines. Formerly Deutz Power Systems
- MWM International Motores, formerly MWM Motores Diesel Ltda in Brazil. A company specialized in the manufacturing of Diesel engines
- the Moustarchindina Wal Moustarchidati, an Islamic movement in Senegal
- Modwheelmood, an electronic-alternative band from Los Angeles
- the Majlis Wahdat-e-Muslimeen, a Shia political party in Pakistan
- married white man, an abbreviation used in personal ads
- Morris water maze, a scientific test typically used on rodents to study behavior
- Megawatt mechanical (MWm) a rarely used measurement in the electric power industry
