= Jacques Boston =

Guinean Anglican bishop

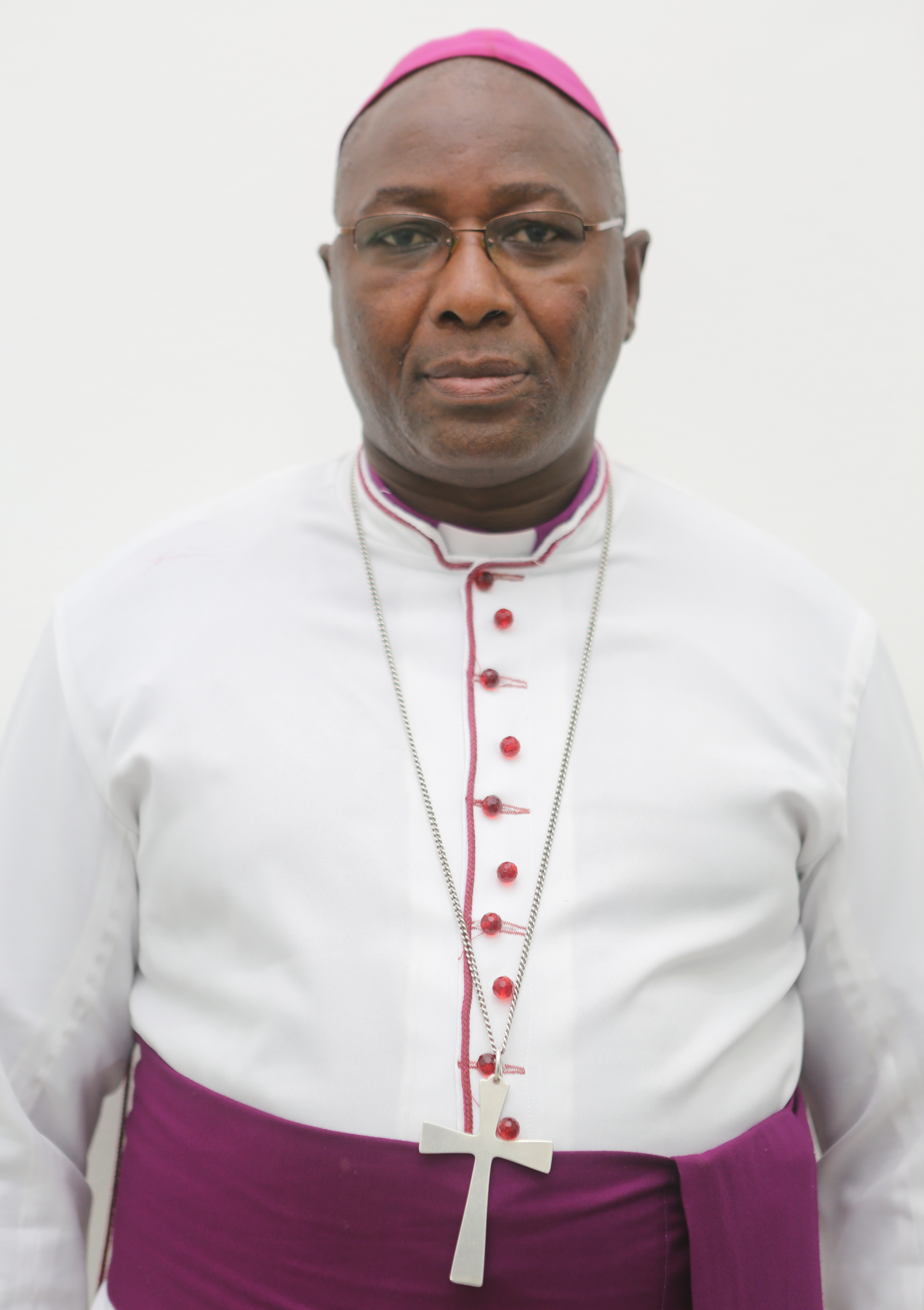
Jacques Boston

Jacques Boston (born 6 March 1973) is an Anglican bishop in Guinea; he has been Bishop of Guinea since 2012.

Boston was born in Conakry and educated at St. Nicholas Cepecoast Seminary. He was ordained to the priesthood in 2004, and was later rector of Ascension Church in Conakry. He has also served as the Diocese of Guinea's Youth Chaplain, Secretary, and Director of Christian Education.
