= The Hang Ups =

American indie pop band

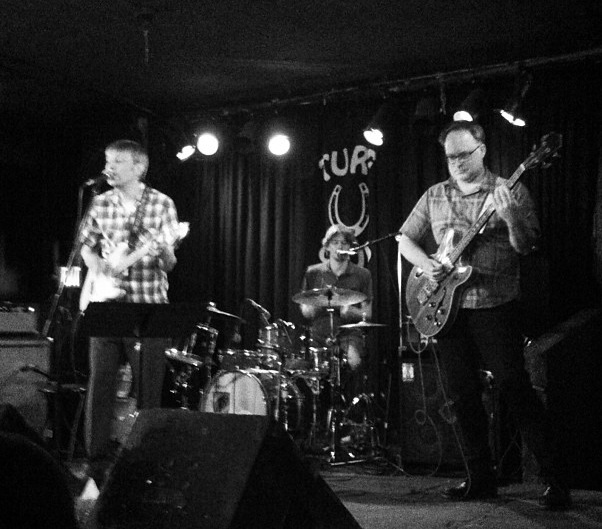
- The Hang Ups (L to R: Tighe, Ittner, Kearns) perform at the Turf Club in St. Paul, Minnesota in 2013

Background information
- Origin: Minneapolis, Minnesota, U.S.
- Genres: Indie pop, indie rock
- Years active: 1990–present
- Labels: Clean, Restless, Trampoline
- Members: Brian Tighe; Jeff Kearns; Stephen Ittner
- Past members: John Crozier; Aaron Lundholm; Chadwick Nelson; Marcel Galang; Todd Newman
- Website: www.tt.net/clean/hangups.html

The Hang Ups are an American indie pop/rock band from Minneapolis, Minnesota, formed in 1990 and fronted by vocalist and guitarist Brian Tighe. Other members include Jeff Kearns (bass, vocals), Stephen Ittner (drums), and John Crozier (guitar). Producer and band friend Bryan Hanna replaced Ittner on the drums while the band toured. The Hang Ups released their debut EP Comin' Through in 1993, and have since released four studio albums. The band's efforts have been met with warm local and national critical response, and are perhaps most well known for the songs "Jump Start", which appeared in the Kevin Smith film Chasing Amy, and "Top of Morning," which featured in an episode of Dawson's Creek.

== History ==
Frontman Brian Tighe originally pursued a career in the visual arts. While working as an artist's assistant in New York City, Tighe began writing music, and eventually abandoned visual arts in favor of music, returning home to Minneapolis to attend the Minneapolis College of Art and Design. There, in 1987, he met Jeff Kearns and Stephen Ittner, and the three later formed the original Hang Ups. Soon after, guitarist John Crozier, formerly of indie-rock group Muskellunge, joined the band after criticizing the original lineup's sound; Steve Holtje of MusicHound Rock praised his inclusion, saying Crozier's guitar "added density and complexity" to their "classic American jangle-pop".

The band was later signed to the local Minneapolis label Clean Records, which the band would stay with for the release of the debut EP Comin' Through and their first full studio album, He's After Me.

Restless Records released The Hang Ups' follow-up So We Go in 1996, as well as their 1999 record Second Story, which was recorded with Don Dixon and Mitch Easter. Reviewing the album for CMJ New Music Monthly, David Daley called it "a pop record for the ages" and wrote that the band's "knack for perfect pop has too often been subjected to slick production", but praised the team of Dixon and Easter, who were working together for the first time since recording R.E.M.'s Murmur and Reckoning 15 years earlier. MusicHound Rock called the title track of So We Go "one of the most beautiful songs of the decade."

2003 saw the release of their self-titled album on Pete Yorn's Trampoline Records. The Hang Ups became available as a digital download for the first time in 2013 on the Korda Records label.

Although the band never officially broke up, by 2011 most of its members had moved on to other projects, with occasional reunions.

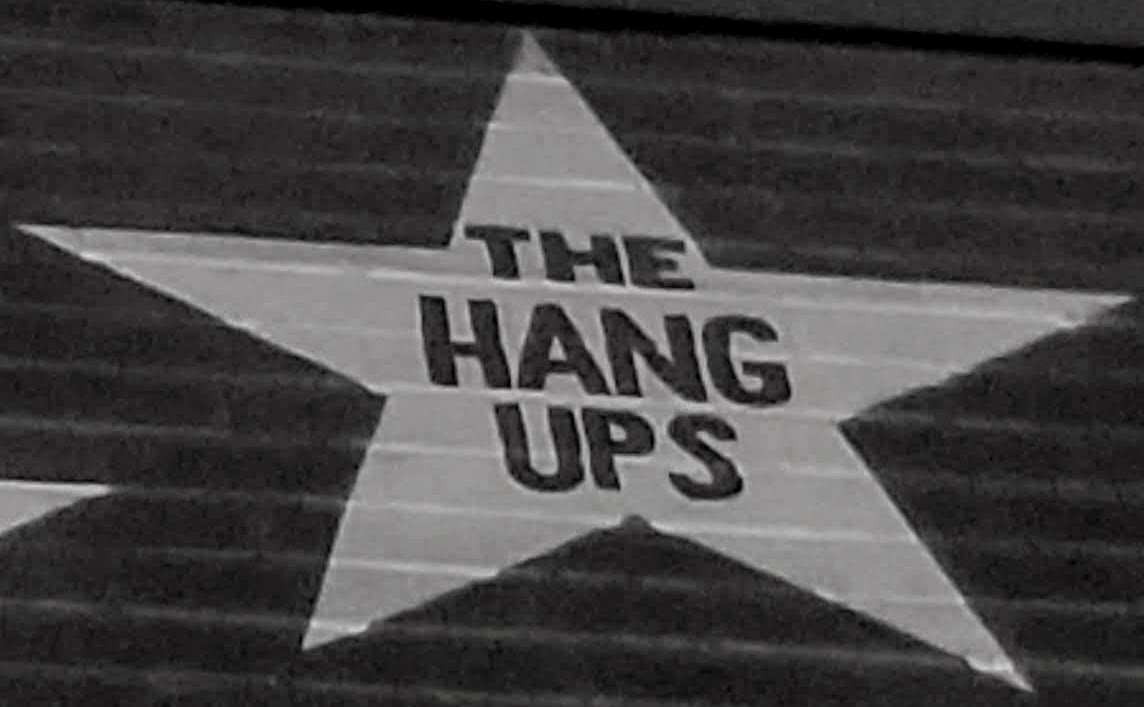
The Hang Ups' star on the outside mural of the Minneapolis nightclub First Avenue

The band has been honored with a star on the outside mural of the Minneapolis nightclub First Avenue, recognizing performers that have played sold-out shows or have otherwise demonstrated a major contribution to the culture at the iconic venue. Receiving a star "might be the most prestigious public honor an artist can receive in Minneapolis," according to journalist Steve Marsh.

== Discography ==
He's After Me
Review scores
Source	Rating
MusicHound	4/5 stars

Comin' Through
Review scores
Source	Rating
MusicHound	3/5 stars

So We Go
Review scores
Source	Rating
MusicHound	3.5/5 stars

=== Studio albums ===
- He's After Me (Clean, 1993)
- So We Go (Restless, 1996)
- Second Story (Restless, 1999)
- The Hang Ups (Trampoline, 2003)

=== EPs ===
- Comin' Through (Clean, 1993)

=== Compilations ===
- Dü Hüskers – The Twin Cities Replay Zen Arcade (Synapse, 1993) The Byrds cover "Eight Miles High"
- Raspberries Preserved (Ginger, 1996) Raspberries cover "I Saw the Light"
- Minneapolis Does Denver: Tribute to John Denver (October 1996) John Denver cover "Leaving on a Jet Plane"
- Pop Romantique: French Pop Classics (Emperor Norton, 1999) Françoise Hardy cover "Pardon"
- Korda Komp 2 (Korda, 2013) previously unreleased track "Angel Please"
