= Carlton Moviehouse =

Former cinema in Carlton, Melbourne, Victoria, Australia

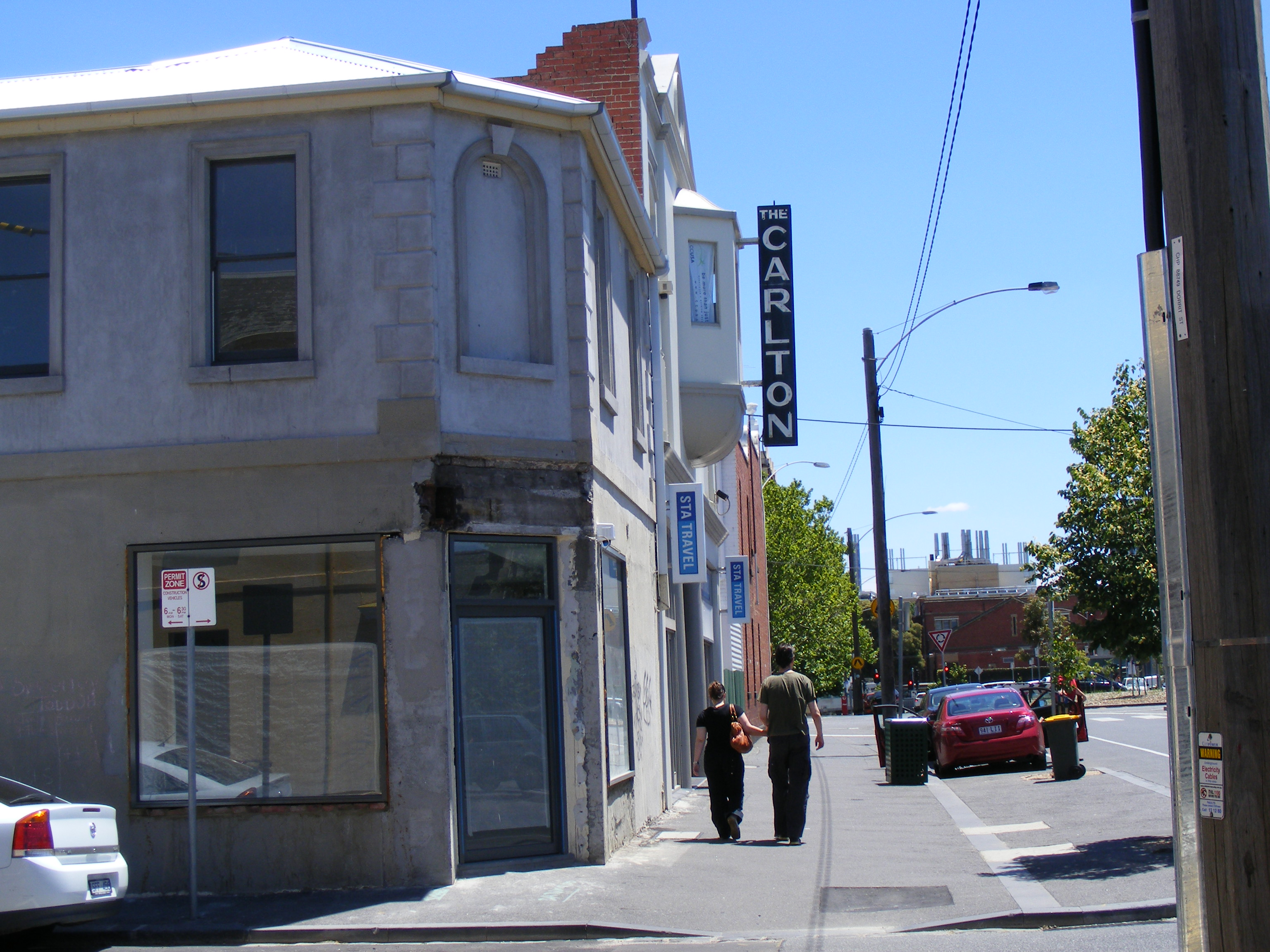
- Former site of the Carlton Moviehouse c2008
- Former names: Carlton Picture Palace (1924-1979)
- Address: 235 Faraday Street, Melbourne VIC 3053; Carlton; Australia
- Coordinates: 37.798815°S 144.966294°E
- Opened: 1924
- Closed: 1999

Carlton Moviehouse was an Australian cinema in Melbourne, Victoria. It closed in 1999.

== History ==
The building later occupied by Carlton Moviehouse was first opened in 1909 for Carlton Trades Club to use as a hall and meeting rooms. It was then used as a billiard hall before being left vacant until 1921 when Samuel Weisberg purchased the building for $2000. It was turned into a Jewish club until 1924 when it was opened as a cinema seating 616.

The cinema was originally known as Carlton Picture Palace and screened silent films with an orchestra. In 1979, the McClelland family stopped operating it and it was taken over and renamed Carlton Moviehouse, though was known to patrons as the Bughouse. It screened avant-garde films, became popular with university students, and was at one time the home of the Melbourne University Film Society and used for the Melbourne International Film Festival.

The cinema only seated 250 when it closed in 1999. At the time, several new cinemas had opened, such as the nearby Cinema Nova that had five screens, while the Carlton Moviehouse had only one, and was no longer profitable.

Throughout its history, the cinema retained its original silent screen, thought to be the only one remaining in Melbourne when it closed in 1999. It was flanked by a mural painting featuring Native American motifs. The building, that occupies the entirety of its 292-square-metre site, retained its original 1909 facade, with minor changes made when it was converted into a cinema.

Following the cinemas closure, the building became a travel agency. In 2014, the building was sold for $3.5 million and "gutted" to become a retail space.
