= Melbourne Cinémathèque =

Australian film society

- Formation: 1948
- Location: Melbourne, Victoria, Australia
- Key people: Michael Koller, Adrian Danks, Eloise Ross, Cerise Howard, Andréas Giannopoulos
- Formerly called: Melbourne University Film Society

The Melbourne Cinémathèque is a non-profit membership-based film society screening programs year-round, dedicated to presenting the history of world cinema on the big screen in carefully curated retrospectives. It screens at ACMI in Melbourne.

== History ==
Starting out as Melbourne University Film Society (MUFS) in 1948, they screened films during lunch time and evenings. MUFS collaborated with Victorian Federation of Film Societies and the Australian Film Institute (AFI) in 1952 to launch Melbourne Film Festival, now known as the Melbourne International Film Festival.

Many of the films shown were from the State Film Centre of Victoria (later known as ACMI), and during the 1960s MUFS screened at various locations around Melbourne, including Union Theatre, Carlton Moviehouse, and later Glasshouse Cinema in RMIT University during the 1980s, and finally relocated to ACMI in 2002.

MUFS changed name to Melbourne Cinémathèque in 1984, the same year they moved to the Glasshouse. In 1993 they partnered with AFI to run a National Cinémathèque, where other states around Australia could collaborate on seasons of touring programs. In 1994, the National Cinémathèque screened at the State Film Theatre in East Melbourne, in association with Melbourne Cinémathèque. 1995 saw the debut of OtherCinémathèque, a separate program of films at Erwin Rado Theatrette that were considered too esoteric or obscure for the National Cinémathèque. Members of Melbourne Cinémathèque could access this new program at no additional charge. The National Cinémathèque program eventually ended and Melbourne Cinémathèque continued.

While ACMI was being renovated in 2019, Melbourne Cinémathèque relocated to The Capitol, and then went online during COVID-19. Their Virtual Cinémathèque sessions were made open to people outside of Melbourne via the internet. A Marlene Dietrich season had been in progress when cinemas were shut down due to COVID-19. A full calendar season returned in 2023.

== Screenings ==
The Melbourne Cinémathèque's mission is to present films in the medium they were created, and as closely as possible to screen them the way they would have originally screened, (i.e. big screen 16 & 35mm prints). They screen archival 35mm and 16mm film prints from local and international organisations such as the National Film and Sound Archive, British Film Institute, and Library of Congress.

Programs include a diverse selection of classic and contemporary films showcasing director retrospectives, special guest appearances and thematic series including archival material and many new prints. Seasons have included A Band of Outsiders: The Cinematic Underworld of Jean-Pierre Melville, 'All Art is One': The Visionary Cinema of Michael Powell and Emeric Pressburger, Life is Art: The World of Jean Renoir, Glacial Crossroads: The Cinema of Michael Haneke, Surviving Kane: Around the World with Orson Welles, and The Music of Time: The World of Max Ophüls, as well as programs dedicated to German Noir, Yasujirō Ozu, Marco Bellocchio, Agnès Varda, Manoel de Oliveira and Barbara Stanwyck, amongst others.

Past programs are collected and archived by State Library Victoria, while a collection of materials relating to Melbourne University Film Society (1948-1971) are held at University of Melbourne.
