= Elysium (disambiguation) =

Elysium is a section of the Underworld in Greek mythology.

Elysium may also refer to:

== Music ==
- Elysium (band), a Polish death metal band

=== Albums ===
- Elysium (Pet Shop Boys album), 2012
- Elysium (Stratovarius album), 2011, or the title track
- Elysium (The Velvet Teen album), 2004

=== Lieder and songs ===
- "Elysium" (Schubert), a lied by Franz Schubert on a poem by Friedrich Schiller
- "Elysium", a song by Scott Brown
  - "Elysium (I Go Crazy)", a remix version by Ultrabeat
- "Elysium", a song by 36 Crazyfists from Rest Inside the Flames
- "Elysium", a song by Chelsea Grin from Desolation of Eden
- "Elysium", a song by Exit Eden from Femmes Fatales
- "Elysium", a song by Invent Animate from Heavener
- "Elysium", a song by Madness from Wonderful
- "Elysium", a song by Mary Chapin Carpenter from Between Here and Gone
- "Elysium", a song by Portishead from Portishead

== Places ==
- Elysium (building), a proposed skyscraper in Melbourne, Australia
- Elysium Arena, an indoor arena in Cleveland, Ohio, US

=== Mars ===
- Elysium Mons, a volcano on Mars
- Elysium Planitia, a plain on Mars
- Elysium quadrangle, a region on Mars covered by a United States Geological Survey map
- Elysium (volcanic province), an albedo feature and volcanic region on Mars

=== Fictional ===
- Elysium (Dungeons & Dragons), a plane of existence in Dungeons & Dragons
- Elysium, a commune in the 2012 film Wanderlust
- Elysium, the utopic city in the Deponia games series
- Elysium, a planet beyond the Solar System in Battlezone
- Elysium, a place of paradise for humanity in Xenoblade Chronicles 2
- Elysium, the moon and the location of the final dungeon in Mega Man Legends 2
- Elysium Labs, a medical laboratory that resides in the city of Glass in Mirror's Edge Catalyst
- Elysium, the fictional world that Disco Elysium takes place in.

== Other uses ==
- Elysium (film), a 2013 film directed by Neill Blomkamp
- Elysium Industries, developers of the Molten Chloride Salt Fast Reactor or MCSFR

== See also ==
- Elizium, an album by Fields of the Nephilim, 1990
