= Elysium (building) =

Coordinates: 37.7761°S 144.9916°E

- An artist's impression of Elysium
- Alternative names: 54 Clarke; Clarke Street Apartment Development

General information
- Status: Never built
- Location: 54-56 Clarke Street, Melbourne, Australia

Height
- Roof: 243.8 m (800 ft)

Technical details
- Floor count: 75 plus 12 underground

Design and construction
- Architecture firm: BKK Architects
- Developer: Matrix & Cube
- Structural engineer: MacLeod Consulting
- Services engineer: SPA Consulting Engineers Pty Ltd

Elysium (also known as 54 Clarke) was a proposed residential skyscraper to be located in the Southbank precinct of Melbourne, Victoria, Australia. Despite receiving planning approval in 2013, the proposed skyscraper was scrapped in 2019.

The project was developed by the Melbourne-based Matrix & Cube group and designed by BKK Architects. Rising to a height of 243.8 m (800 ft), Elysium would have contained up to 288 residential apartments, across 75 levels; this would have made it one of the tallest buildings in Melbourne. Its design was notable for a slender appearance – with a width of 12 m (39 ft) at its narrowest – which had earned it a reputation for being one of the "skinniest skyscraper (proposals)" in Melbourne.

First proposed in 2011, Elysium received approval twice in 2013 by then-Planning Minister Matthew Guy; initially in February 2013, which was later challenged through Victorian Civil and Administrative Tribunal (VCAT), and then subsequently in December 2013. In 2019, the proposed skyscraper was cancelled, with plans resubmitted for a high-rise residential building of 24 levels.
