= Second Story (The Hang Ups album) =

Studio album by The Hang Ups
- Released: 1999
- Genre: Indie rock music
- Label: Restless Records

The Hang Ups chronology
So We Go (1996)	Second Story (1999)	The Hang Ups (2003)

Professional ratings
Review scores
Source	Rating
AllMusic	4/5 stars

Second Story is an album by The Hang Ups, released in 1999 on Restless Records. The production team of Mitch Easter and Don Dixon hadn't worked together as a dedicated production team since recording R.E.M.'s Murmur and Reckoning more than 15 years before.

== Critical reception ==
AllMusic wrote that the band "can build a whole song out of a lugubrious piano, a folky guitar and an antiquated harpsichord, the beautiful bowing of a sonorous violin, or McCartney-esque ringing pop, and make the whole thing hang together." The Richmond Times-Dispatch wrote that the album "features a host of melodically engaging tunes from unheralded songwriter Brian Tighe." Washington City Paper wrote that the band "juice their sound with a force they used to only imply, resulting in the most jagged, Brit-poppy music of their career."

== Track listing ==
1. Caroline – 3:10
2. Second Story – 5:40
3. Pretty BA – 2:59
4. Parkway – 3:25
5. Underneath A Tree – 4:10
6. Out Of Touch – 2:51
7. Long Goodbye – 4:03
8. Blue Sky – 1:32
9. The Queen – 2:42
10. Maroon – 4:39
11. Party – 2:31
12. Epic – 5:16
13. Untitled 0:57
