= Champs-Élysées (disambiguation) =

The Avenue des Champs-Élysées is a world famous boulevard in the 8th arrondissement of Paris.

Champs-Élysées may also refer to:

- Champs Élysées salad lettuce by Trader Joe's Les Salads du Midi
- Champs Elysees (horse) (foaled 2003 in England), a Thoroughbred racehorse
- Champs-Élysées–Clemenceau station, a Paris Metro railway station in the 8th arrondissement of Paris
- Champs-Élysées Film Festival, held annually in Paris
- Champs-Élysées stage in the Tour de France, since 1975 the final stage of that bicycle stage race, finishing with several circuits of the Avenue des Champs-Élysées
- Jardin des Champs-Élysées, a public park located in the 8th arrondissement of Paris
- Le Roi des Champs-Élysées, a 1934 French comedy film starring Buster Keaton
- "Les Champs-Élysées", a 1969 song by Joe Dassin
- Orchestre des Champs-Élysées, an orchestra which specialises in classical music from about 1750 to the early twentieth century using instruments of the time
- Quartier des Champs-Élysées, an administrative district in the 8th arrondissement of Paris
- Théâtre des Champs-Élysées, a theatre located in Quartier des Champs-Élysées, Paris
- Champs Elysées (album), a 2000 album by French producer Bob Sinclar
- La Clef Champs-Élysées Paris, a hotel near the Champs-Élysées

== See also ==
- Elysian Fields
