= Melbourne Winter Masterpieces series =

Annual series of major exhibitions held in Australia

The Melbourne Winter Masterpieces is an annual series of major exhibitions held over 100 days in Melbourne, Victoria, Australia. Exhibits are sourced from galleries and institutions from around the world, and exhibited at Melbourne Museum, National Gallery of Victoria and Australian Centre for the Moving Image. The annual series held during the Melbourne Winter – between June and October.

The objectives of the Melbourne Winter Masterpieces series are to:

- Attract national and international visitors to Victoria during what was traditionally the quieter tourism period.
- Generate significant economic impact for the state
- Generate significant national and international media exposure for Victoria

The Melbourne Winter Masterpieces have been credited with attracting 5 million visitors to Melbourne, and for injecting $400 million into the Victorian state economy.

The Melbourne Winter Masterpiece exhibition for 2025 will be French Impressionism: From the Museum of Fine Arts, Boston, at the National Gallery of Victoria from 6 June to 5 October 2025.

== Exhibitions ==
Previous exhibition held from 2004, include:

=== Melbourne Museum ===
- 2009 A Day in Pompeii
- 2011 Tutankhamun and the Golden Age of the Pharaohs

=== National Gallery of Victoria ===
- 2004 Impressionists: Masterpieces from the Musée d'Orsay
- 2005 Dutch Masters
- 2006 Picasso: Love and War 1935–1945
- 2007 Guggenheim Collection: 1940s to Now
- 2008 Art Deco 1910–1939
- 2009 Dalí: Liquid Desire
- 2010 European Masters: Städel Museum, 19th–20th Century
- 2011 Vienna: Art & Design, Klimt, Schiele, Hoffmann
- 2012 Napoleon: Revolution to Empire
- 2013 Monet’s Garden
- 2014 Italian Masterpieces from Spain's Royal Court, Museo del Prado
- 2015 Masterpieces from the Hermitage: The Legacy of Catherine the Great
- 2016 Degas: A New Vision
- 2017 Van Gogh And The Seasons
- 2018 Masterworks from MoMA
- 2019 Terracotta Warriors: Guardians of Immortality
- 2021 French Impressionism: From the Museum of Fine Arts, Boston
- 2022 The Picasso Century
- 2023 Pierre Bonnard: Designed by India Mahdavi
- 2024 Pharaoh
- 2025 French Impressionism: From the Museum of Fine Arts, Boston

=== Australian Centre for the Moving Image ===
- 2007 Pixar: 20 Years of Animation
- 2010 Tim Burton: The Exhibition
- 2012 Game Masters
- 2013 Hollywood Costume
- 2014 DreamWorks Animation: The Exhibition
- 2015 David Bowie Is
- 2017 Wallace & Gromit and friends: The magic of Aardman
- 2018 Wonderland
- 2021 Disney: The Magic of Animation
- 2022 Light: Works from Tate’s Collection
- 2023 Goddess: Power, Glamour, Rebellion

== Attendances ==
Melbourne Winter Masterpieces Exhibitions by attendance
Year	Exhibition	Attendance	Exhibitor
2024	Pharaoh	336,000	National Gallery of Victoria
2023	Pierre Bonnard: Designed by India Mahdavi	157,317	National Gallery of Victoria
2022	The Picasso Century	314,238	National Gallery of Victoria
2019	Terracotta Warriors & Cai Guo-Qiang	377,105	National Gallery of Victoria
2018	Wonderland	179,000	Australian Centre for the Moving Image
2018	MoMA: 130 Years of Modern and Contemporary Art	404,034	National Gallery of Victoria
2017	Van Gogh and the Seasons	462,262	National Gallery of Victoria
2016	Degas: A New Vision	197,500	National Gallery of Victoria
2015	Masterpieces from the Hermitage	172,000	National Gallery of Victoria
2015	David Bowie Is	199,000	Australian Centre for the Moving Image
2014	Italian Masterpieces from Spain's Royal Court: Museo del Prado	153,000	National Gallery of Victoria
2014	DreamWorks Animation	220,000	Australian Centre for the Moving Image
2013	Monet's Garden	343,000	National Gallery of Victoria
2013	Hollywood Costumes	204,000	Australian Centre for the Moving Image
2012	Game Masters	103,000	Australian Centre for the Moving Image
2012	Napoleon: Revolution to Empire	189,000	National Gallery of Victoria
2011	Tutankhamun and the Golden Age of the Pharaohs	796,000	Melbourne Museum
2011	Vienna: Art and Design	172,000	National Gallery of Victoria
2010	European Masters: Stadel Collection 19th – 20th Centuries	200,000	National Gallery of Victoria
2010	Tim Burton: The Exhibition	276,000	Australian Centre for the Moving Image
2009	A Day in Pompeii	333,000	Melbourne Museum
2009	Salvador Dali: Liquid Desire	333,000	National Gallery of Victoria
2008	Art Deco 1910–1939	241,000	National Gallery of Victoria
2007	Guggenheim Collection 1940's to Now	180,000	National Gallery of Victoria
2007	Pixar: 20 Years of Animation	147,000	Australian Centre for the Moving Image
2006	Picasso: Love & War 1935 -1945	224,000	National Gallery of Victoria
2005	Dutch Masters from the Rijksmuseum	219,000	National Gallery of Victoria
2004	The Impressionists: Masterpieces from the Musée d'Orsay	371,000	National Gallery of Victoria
Total		6,317,796	

== See also ==
- Melbourne
- Melbourne Museum
- National Gallery of Victoria
- Australian Centre for the Moving Image
- Culture of Melbourne
