= Elysée Loustallot =

- Born: December 25, 1761; Saint-Jean-d'Angély, Nouvelle-Aquitaine
- Died: September 19, 1790 (aged 28); Paris, France
- Occupations: Lawyer; Journalist; Editor of Revolutions of Paris

Elysée Loustallot (December 25, 1761 – September 19, 1790) was a French lawyer, journalist, and editor of the Revolutions of Paris during the French Revolution. He is remembered as one of the major Parisian opinion journalists during the era of the National Assembly and subsequent National Constituent Assembly. A fervent republican, his journalistic writings were anti-royalist in tone and bourgeois in sympathy. As a student trained in philosophy and the French Enlightenment, Loustallot is generally considered by historians to have been a principal proponent of revolution, while cautioning its readership against violence and ideological extremism. This is notably in contrast to the opinion journalism of Jean-Paul Marat's proletariat appeal to the sans-culottes. On the one hand, Loustallot writing articulates the need to reconcile the legitimacy of the Third Estate's call for less taxation and more civil rights, with the necessity of keeping in check the superstition, ignorance, and error of the Parisian masses underpinning the revolutionary fervor of the Third Estate. In particular, Loustallot wrote extensively on issues of social and economic justice, including the price of bread and the unaffordability of foodstuffs and basic staples. He died from illness at the age of 28.

== Early life ==
Loustallot was a member of a Protestant family native to Guyenne, France. He was born into a wealthy bourgeois family, as the son of d'Elisee Loustallot, a lawyer in Saint-Jean-d'Angely, and Marie-Marguerite-Louise Caffin. The family traces it origins in Saint Jean d'Angely for nearly two centuries, where a number of Loustallot's ancestors served as prosecutors or lawyers in the Seneschal.

Loustallot studied the humanities in a college run by the Benedictines. In 1778, he studied philosophy and physics at Poitiers, where he defended a thesis in philosophy. In 1780, he attended law school for three years in Bordeaux. He graduated on February 5, 1783, becoming a lawyer in Saint Jean d'Angely, like his father. However, he left a year later for Bordeaux, settling into the city on January 22, 1784. Having attacked the Seneschal of his hometown, Loustallot was suspended for six months by the Parliament of Bordeaux. In early 1787, he moved to Paris, where he wrote anonymous pamphlets and translations.

== Revolutions of Paris ==
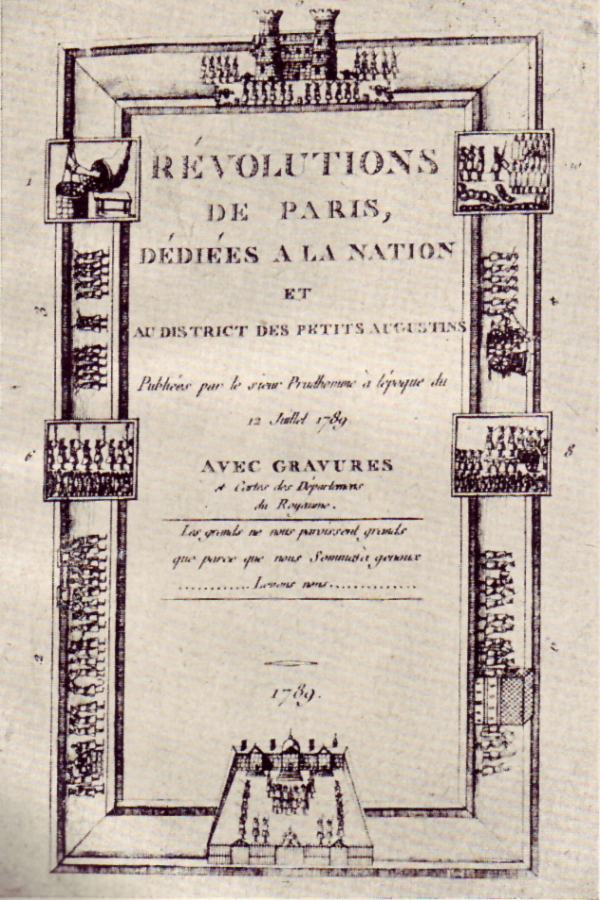
Cover of the first issue of Revolutions of Paris, July 17, 1789.

Loustallot left Bourdeaux and arrived in Paris in 1787. The year 1788 marked the largest crop failure in France in the 18th century, exacerbating pre-existing tensions. During this time, Loustallot worked in the authorship and translation of pamphlets. On June 17, 1789, the Third Estate voted in the Hotel des Menus Plaisirs 490-90 to form the National Constituent Assembly. This act is taken to mark the political birth of the French Revolution. Shortly thereafter, J. L. Prudhomme founded and financed the Revolutions of Paris, where Loustallot joined as the founding editor and a major author. Loustallot's Revolutions of Paris printed its inaugural issue on July 17, 1789, three days after the sans-culotte rebels succeeded in storming the Bastille. In its first fourteen months of publication, he personally wrote the first sixty issues of the newspaper. In 1790, with the recent lax in censorship laws and the tide of revolutionary sensationalism, Paris had 133 journals being published. The Revolutions of Paris was considered to be among the most distinguished and impartial of the lot.

== Death and legacy ==
Loustallot became seriously ill and frail in 1790. However, he still managed to publish his last issue of the Revolutions of Paris on September 4, 1790, two weeks before his death. His final work was a commentary on the Nancy mutiny. He died on September 19, 1790, at the age of 28. After learning of his death, the Jacobins sent Maximilien Robespierre and Louis Sébastien Mercier as representatives to his funeral. The Jacobin and Cordelier clubs mourned his death for three days.

Loustallot was the main contributor of the Revolutions of Paris up until his death. Prudhomme continued publishing the paper, with later writers Chaumette, Sylvain Maréchal, Fabre d'Eglantine, and Saintonax continuing on the journalistic standards of Loustallot. He is remembered as being a moderating voice against bloodshed, while passionately prescribing to republicanism in the early stages of Revolutionary France.

== See also ==
- French Revolution
- Girondins
- Jacobin
- Legislative Assembly (France)
- National Constituent Assembly

== Bibliography and further reading ==
- Durant, Will; Durant, Ariel (1992). The Age of Napoleon, volume 11. Norwalk, CT: Easton Press.
- Hervé Guénot, « Révolutions de Paris (Les) », Albert Soboul (dir.), Dictionnaire historique de la Révolution française, Paris, PUF, 1989 (rééd. Quadrige, 2005, p. 907-908).
- Sophie Hacot, Élysée Loustallot : l'Homme et son travail d'après ses articles du journal des Révolutions de Paris (oct 1789-janv 1790), 113 pages.
- Marcellin Pellet, Élysée Loustallot et les Révolutions de Paris (juillet 1789-septembre 1790), A. Le Chevalier, 1872, 308 pages.
- Pierre Larousse, « Loustallot (Élisée) », Grand dictionnaire universel du XIXe siècle, tome dixième, p. 733-734, 1873.
