= Élisée Maclet =

French painter

Jules Émile Élisée Maclet (12 April 1881 – 23 August 1962) was a French Impressionist painter, particularly known for his views of Montmartre.

== Family and background ==
Maclet was born the son of a gardener and a laundress at Lihons in the Santerre region in Picardy. His family was poor and he began work very young as an assistant to his father. Picardy is renowned for its roses, and Maclet used to say that he was born among cabbages and roses. His artistic talent became evident very early. His father was also the sexton of the local parish church, where Maclet became a choirboy. The parish priest, Father Delval, was also an amateur painter, and often on fine Sundays he took the boy out to sketch and paint in the countryside.

The artist Puvis de Chavannes found the same scenes a source of inspiration, and on an April Sunday in 1892 happened to see some of the boy's work. The artist was so impressed that he asked Maclet's father to allow his son to study with him, but the father refused.

In spite of paternal opposition, in 1906 Maclet gave up gardening for art and moved to Montmartre, where while painting he supported himself with a variety of casual work (varnishing iron bedsteads, decorating the floats for the gala nights at the Moulin Rouge, washed dishes or opening oysters in restaurants). For several months in 1909 he served as a cook on board a ship sailing from Marseilles to Indochina. In 1912 he returned to Paris, where he painted dolls in crinolines and exhibited them at the Salon des Humoristes. But in spite of all these occupations, he found time to paint.

== Career ==
When Maclet arrived in Montmartre, much of the country charm of the area still existed and he put it on canvas, even before Utrillo did so. Biographers have rather tended to pass over in silence the services Maclet rendered to Utrillo. Maclet knew practically all the future great painters of his time, Utrillo among them, and it is certain that he helped him, though his own reluctance to have people write about him may account for the fact that it is known only through oblique remarks in the records of the time. Maclet painted the Lapin Agile, the Moulin de la Galette, and the Maison de Mimi Pinson several years before Utrillo painted them. He painted most often in winter in this period, skilfully suggesting snow by leaving bare white spaces in his canvas or paper.

In a short time Maclet won a circle of sincere admirers. The art dealer Dosbourg bought his work, which gave him a fairly reliable source of income and enabled him to devote more time than ever to his painting. From Montmartre he launched out into the suburbs of Paris, painting them with the same affection with which he treated the scenes of Montmartre.

When war broke out in 1914, Maclet served as a medical attendant in a temporary hospital run by the Little Sisters of the Poor. That allowed him to spend his periods of leave back in Montmartre, where he stayed at the Lapin Agile thanks to the hospitality of his friend Père Frédé. Maclet slept in the cabaret hall and paid for his food by washing dishes and polishing the copper pots. While on one of these periods of leave, he painted two small pictures of the Sacré-Coeur and the Moulin de la Galette which he sold to a M. Deibler, who combined his profession of official executioner with a love of the fine arts. Francis Carco, the painter and poet, was also an admirer of his work and became a patron.

When the war ended in 1918, Maclet returned to Montmartre. Carco, feeling that the painter needed to widen his horizons, sent him to stay in Dieppe, and the sea coast soon featured in Maclet's paintings. In the following year he came back to Montmartre and to his former subjects. Montmartre was now changing: new apartment buildings were going up, taking the place of the green spaces, and under a huge reconstruction the picturesqueness of the Ourcq Canal was soon to disappear, as were the laundry boats on the Seine. Maclet captured these things in his canvases.

His views of Paris were now earning him increasing recognition and success. Besides Carco, he found supporters in the famous writer Colette and the American art dealer Hugo Perlsall, who regarded him as the equal of other great painters of the period. Max Jacob wrote about him. Famous dealers of the time, such as Pierre Menant and Matho Kleimann-Boch, hung Maclet's work beside the paintings of Van Gogh and Picasso in their galleries.

In 1923 Maclet entered into a contract with a wealthy Austrian manufacturer, Baron von Frey, a condition of which was that he should leave Paris for the south of France, as the Baron sensed that Maclet would know how to handle the brilliant light and intense colors of the Midi. The Baron's judgment was vindicated only a few hours after Maclet's arrival in Arles, when the son of an old and famous friend of Van Gogh's said to him, "Not since Van Gogh have I seen a painter use such pure color as you do." Maclet stayed in the region from 1924 to 1928. He painted in Orange, Vaison-la-Romaine, La Ciotat, Cassis, Golfe-Juan, Antibes, Cagnes, Saint-Paul-de-Vence, Villefranche, Nice, Menton, and (in Italy) San Remo, sending back to Frey glowing landscapes and glorious floral still lifes. Von Frey reserved for himself almost the total output of this period and sent most of the paintings to America, where wealthy collectors vied to buy them at high prices.

Many magazines devoted articles to Maclet, and an exhibition of his work was presented in Paris in 1928. Frey also had the satisfaction of seeing paintings by Maclet purchased by important museums in Lyons, Grenoble, and Monte Carlo.

== Illness ==
At the end of 1928, Maclet went to paint in Corsica. He spent 1929 and 1930 in Brittany and then went back to his native Picardy to paint. In the middle of 1933 he suffered the onset of a serious mental illness, from which he never entirely recovered, and was institutionalised for several months. After 1935 he resumed his studies of Paris and in 1945 presented a large exhibition of his work under the title Autour du Moulin ("Around the Moulin") which elicited from André Warnod the following glowing tribute: "What a happy spectacle to see Maclet paint. He begins by covering the top of his canvas with paint, the sky, the clouds. Then he attacks the chimneys and then the roofs, and then, floor by floor, he arrives at the street level of the houses... Under his brush, all becomes miraculously organized; he places the figures where they should be, and when he has painted the last paving block at the very bottom of the canvas, then he signs it. And the painting is finished; a happy painting expressing the joy of living."

When he made sporadic visits to Paris during his years in the south of France, the painters of Montmartre and Montparnasse considered him a painter on the rise, but the public remained indifferent. In 1957 a Parisian gallery organized a retrospective exhibition of Maclet's work, and the solid rise in the prices of his paintings dates from that retrospective exhibition.

Five years of life remained to the painter, years described by Marcel Guicheteau and Jean Cottel in these words: "Maclet had returned to his first loves, to his first poems; but it was with all his experience, all his wisdom that the old man now bent over the familiar motifs; his minor song had become a song full of light. In the evening of his life he could repeat himself without copying himself; explain himself without humiliating himself; remember himself without destroying himself. He had brought his work to such a degree of perfection that each painting from then on justified itself by references to earlier work and conferred, in a sense, a retroactive value on those works of a far-off past. The artist had reached the state wherein his work soundly established, across the years, its various pictorial values like echoes answering each other at intervals of ten, fifteen, twenty years, all singing the same harmony."

He died in the Lariboisière Hospital in Paris on 23 April 1962 and is buried in the cemetery at Lihons next to his parents.

== Bibliography ==
- E. Bénézit, Dictionnaire des Peintres, Sculpteurs, Dessinateurs et Graveurs, Vol. 7, p. 48. Paris: Librairie Grund, 1976
- Martine and Bertrand Willot: Élisée Maclet, le dernier Montmartrois, Édition La Vie d'Artiste et Galerie Villain ISBN 2913639062
- Jean Cottel and Marcel Guicheteau, 1982: Elisée Maclet, catalogue raisonné, ABC Collection
- Marcel Guicheteau and Jan Cottel, 1960: "Maclet" in L'Information Artistique
- Marcel Guicheteau and Jean Cottel: Maclet, with preface by Georges Peillex, Édition D'Arte Fratelli Pozzo
- Exhibition catalogue 23 March to 23 April 2007, Galerie Jean-Paul Villain
- André Roussard, 1999: Les peintres à Montmartre, pp. 262–390. Paris ISBN 9782951360105
- François Pedron, 2008: Elisée Maclet est présenté dans les rapins - l'age d'or de Montmartre, pp. 183–185. Ed: La Belle Gabrielle ISBN 9782952770576
- Jack Russel (transl.), 2008: Of Paupers and Painters - Studios of Montmartre Masters, pp. 183–185. Ed: La Belle Gabrielle ISBN 9782952770576
