= Jean Rigal Elisée =

Jean Rigal Elisée (20 September 1927 – 20 September 2017) was an Episcopalian bishop in the Gambia and surrounding areas in the last third of the 20th century.

Elisée was born in Léogâne. He was educated at Episcopal Divinity School, Philadelphia. He was ordained deacon and priest in 1952. He served in Haiti and Monrovia. Elisée was Bishop of Gambia and the Rio Pongas from 1972 to 1986.
