= Second Story Interactive Studios =

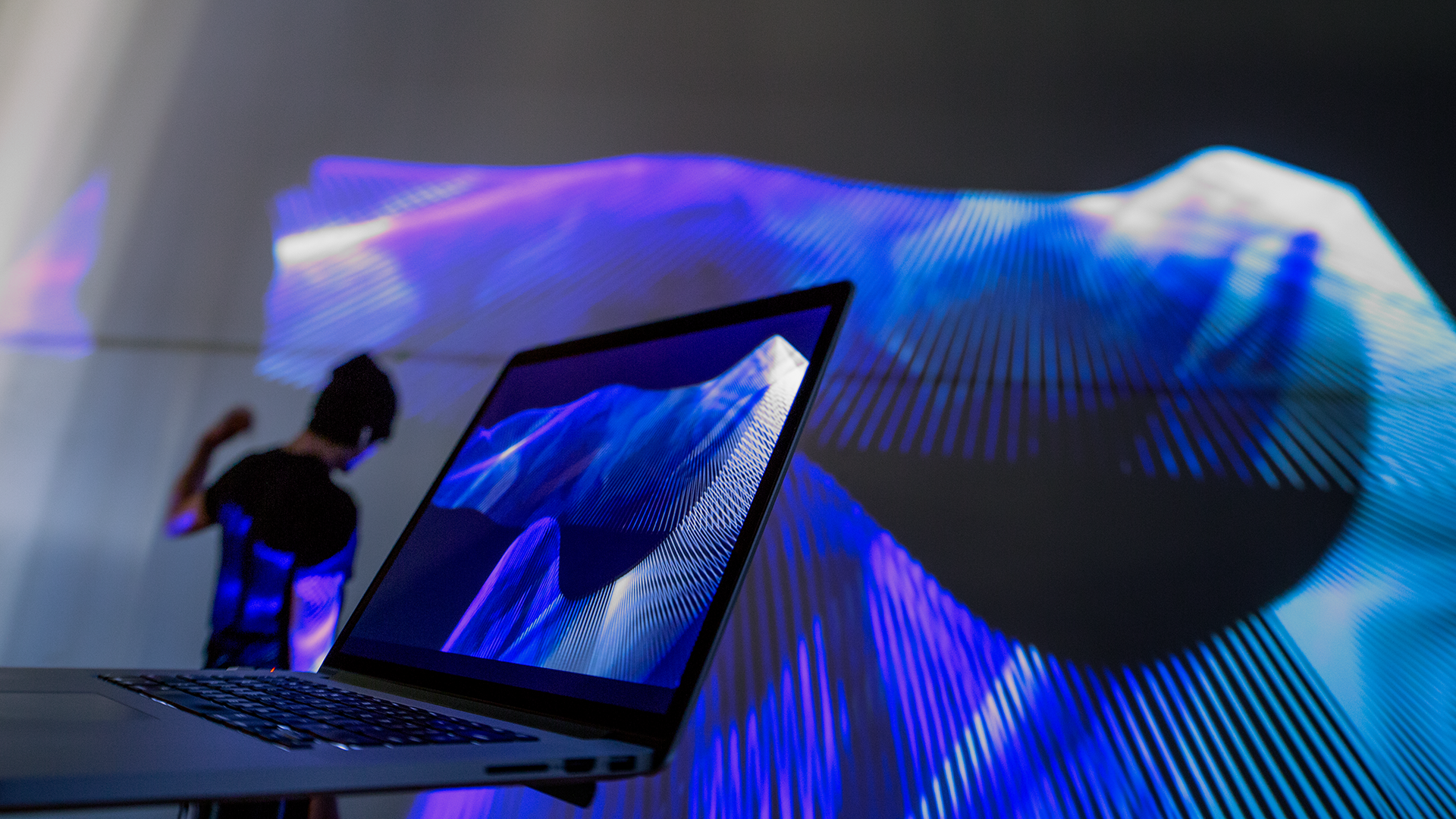
- Company type: Publicly owned
- Industry: Interactive design
- Founded: 1994
- Headquarters: Portland, Oregon United States
- Number of employees: 30-35
- Website: www.secondstory.com

Second Story is an interactive media with studios in Portland, Atlanta, and New York City. It was co-founded by Brad Johnson and Julie Beeler, created from Brad Johnson Presents, which began in 1994 in Berkeley, California. The firm is known for interactive storytelling.

In 2012 Second Story was acquired by SapientNitro. With the 2015 acquisition of Sapient by [Publicis] Second Story became part of Publicis.

== Notable projects ==
Notable projects include the Ford Alumni Center at the University of Oregon, The Vault of the Secret Formula exhibit at the World of Coca-Cola, and the media for the Age of Mammals exhibit at the Natural History Museum of Los Angeles County. They have designed interactive web sites and installations for the National Archives, the museum at Gettysburg National Military Park, the Library of Congress, the National Baseball Hall of Fame, National Geographic, Museum of Modern Art in New York, and The Grammy Museum.

== Awards ==
For its work since 1994, Second Story has received many awards in competitions, festivals, and events, including two Best of Shows at HOW magazine's Interactive Design Awards: in 2009 for the visitor experience at the Library of Congress and in 2011 for the Design Your Own Ballpark kiosk at the Kansas City Royals Hall of Fame).

In 2004 the studio was a finalist for a National Design Award in Communications Design. The University of Oregon project earned Second Story an award at the 2012 Interaction Design Association (IxDA) Awards.

Second Story has also been recognized by I.D. Annual Review, the IxDA Awards, AIGA 365, Communication Arts Interactive Design Annual, Print Magazine's Digital Design Annual, the One Show Interactive, and the Art Directors Awards (including 2 Gold).

In the museum industry their work has been recognized by the American Association of Museums in almost every category of the annual Muse Awards, and their Web sites for cultural institutions have won nine Best of the Web Awards at the annual Museums and the Web conference. Their Web sites have been featured and awarded in the SXSW festival, the Sundance Film Festival, and the Webby Awards.
