= BKK Architects =

Australian architectural practice

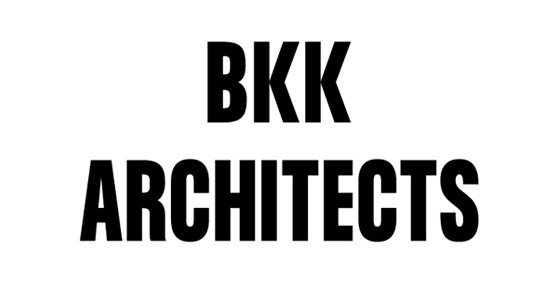

Practice information
- Partners: Tim Black, Simon Knott
- Founded: 2000
- Location: 6/114 Flinders Street, Melbourne, Victoria, Australia

Website
- b-k-k.com.au

BKK Architects is an Australian architectural practice based in Melbourne, Victoria. The firm was established in 2000 by architects Tim Black and Simon Knott, whom are graduates of the Royal Melbourne Institute of Technology. Realized commissions include a broad spectrum of residential, commercial, public and institutional buildings, as well as infrastructure and urban design projects.

Current undertakings include Melbourne's landmark Clark Street Tower and the Central Dandenong Urban Masterplan. The philosophy of BKK is design-based problem solving and is not limited to specific building typologies, although an emerging focus in their work is place making. The firm has strong research interests and established affiliations with several Melbourne educational institutions.

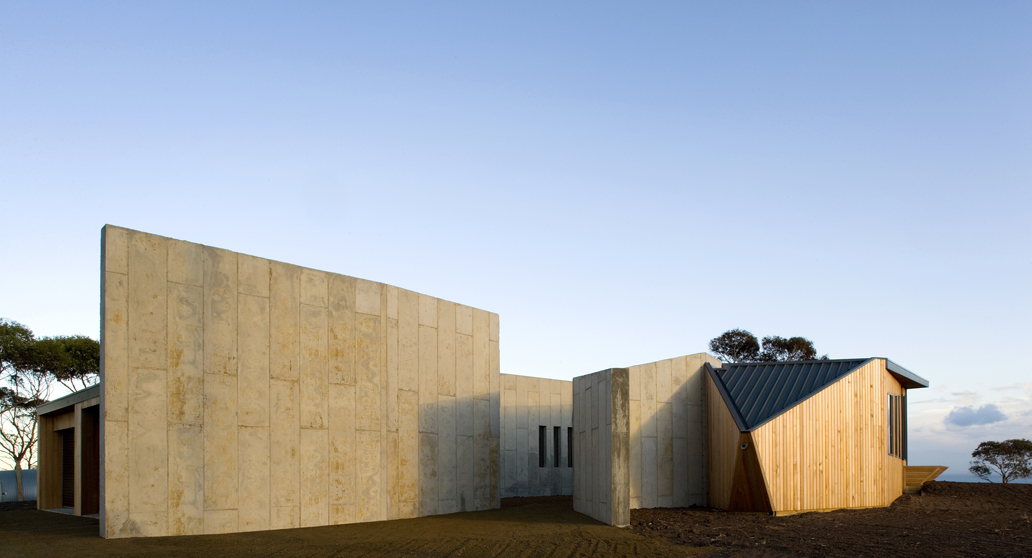
Contour House, Bellarine Peninsula

== Notable projects ==
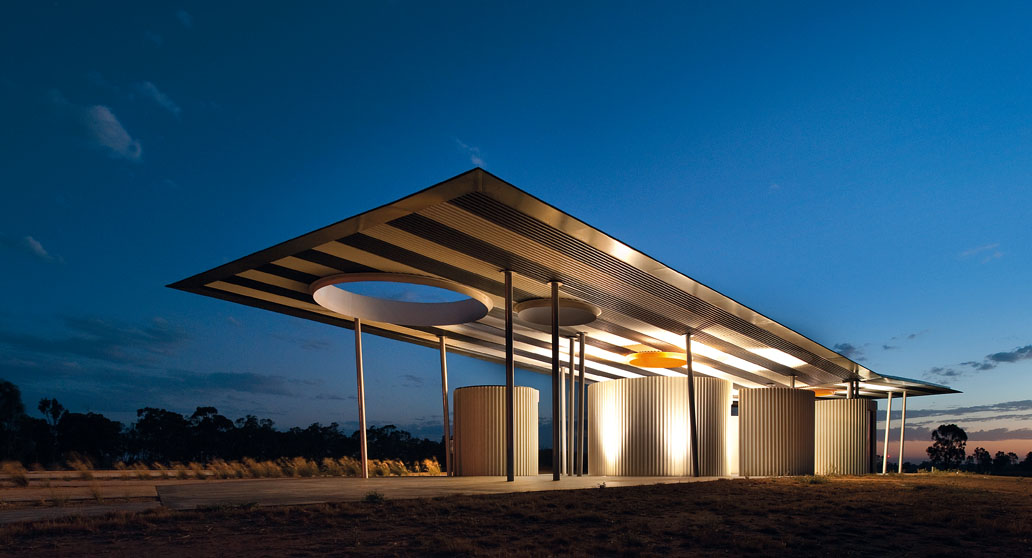
Calder Woodburn rest area

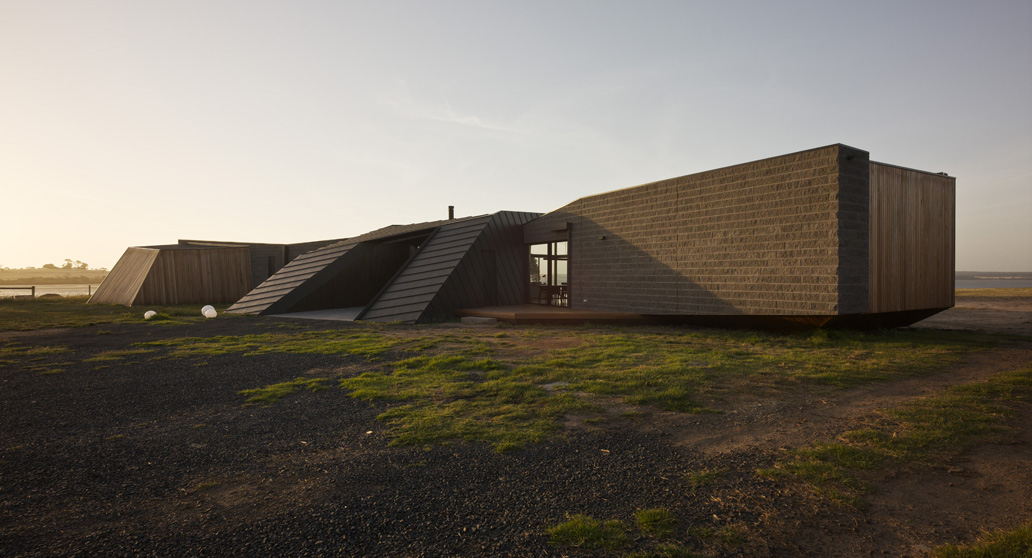
Beached House

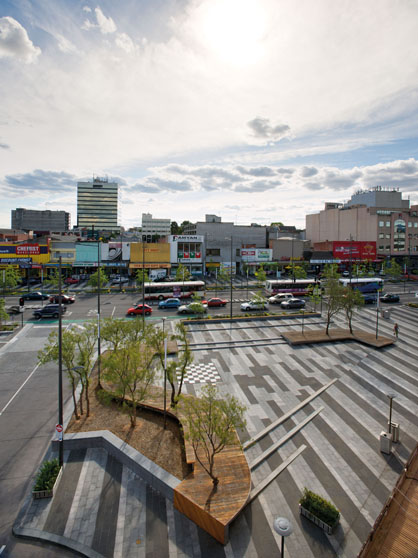
Central Dandenong Lonsdale street redesign and upgrade, Dandenong

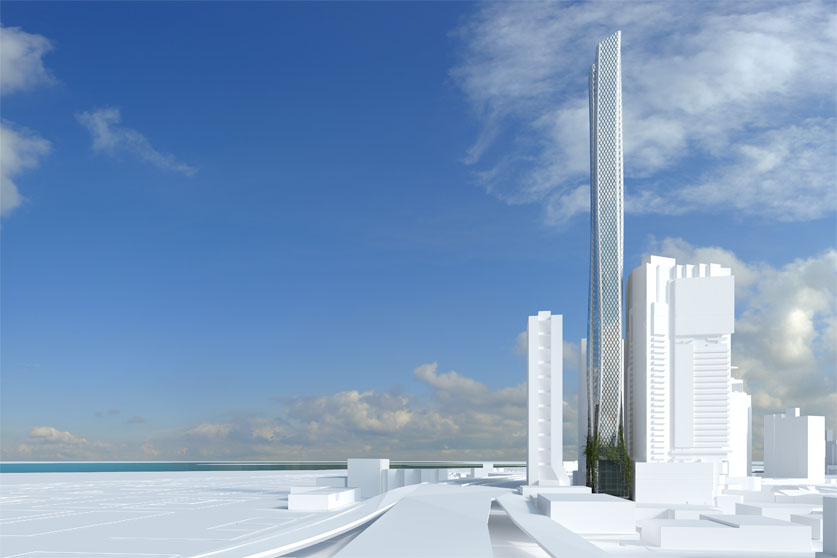
Clarke street apartment tower, Southbank

Completed	Project name	Location	Award	Notes
2003	Wrap House	Toorak, Melbourne	City of Stonnington Urban Design Award (2004)	
2003	2-Parts House	Elwood, Melbourne		
2006	Vic roads soundwalls, Monash Freeway	Burwood, Melbourne		
2008	Calder Woodburn Rest Area, Goulburn Valley Highway		Interior Design Awards, Winner Colour in Commercial Design (2010); CCAA Public Domain Awards, Winner Public Artwork Award (2009)	
2008	Great wall of Warburton	Warburton		
2009	Beached House	Western Port, Victoria	AIA Victorian Architecture Awards, Winner Residential Architecture New (2011)	
2011	Central Dandenong urban masterplan	Dandenong, Victoria	AIA National Architecture Awards, Walter Burley Griffin Award for Urban Design (2013)	
2012	Holiday House	Mornington, Victoria		
2012	Australian Garden Shelters	Royal Botanic Gardens in Cranbourne		
2013	Ring Road Rest Areas	Geelong, Victoria		
in progress	Clarke Street Apartment Tower	Southbank		
in progress	Tower turnaround	Fitzroy		

== Research ==
BKK Architects is involved with several high-profile architectural research projects in affiliation with various partners. These include the Bi-Directional Evolutionary Structural Optimization (BESO) project in collaboration with RMIT University and Soundwall technologies working in concert with Australian acoustic engineering firms and plastic manufacturers.

== Media ==
In 2003 Simon Knott and Stuart Harrison established a weekly Tuesday night architecture radio show on 3RRR. Called The Architects, the duo was later joined with Rory Hyde and Christine Phillip and focused on boarding the understanding of architecture in the wider community. In 2005 Knott and Hyde won the AIA Victoria Bates Smart Award for Architecture in the Media.

In 2013 ABC Radio National featured an eight-week segment on Art Nation called The Good, the Bad and the Ugly hosted by Knott and Harrison. In 2012 the show won the Bates Smart Award for Architecture in the Media. Segments featured The Arts Prescient, Dockland and Fed Square.

== See also ==
- Architecture of Australia
