= Ofosu =

Ofosu is an Akan surname with Ashanti origins. Notable people with the surname include:

- Emmanuel Ofosu Yeboah (born 1977), Ghanaian athlete and activist
- Lawrence Henry Yaw Ofosu-Appiah (1920–1990), Ghanaian academic
- Michael Ofosu-Appiah (born 1983), Ghanaian footballer
- Phil Ofosu-Ayeh (born 1991), German-Ghanaian footballer
- Reagy Ofosu (born 1991), German footballer
- Samuel Ofosu-Ampofo, Ghanaian politician
