= Ghana Library Association =

Academic journal and professional librarian organization in Ghana

The Ghana Library Association (GLA) is the main professional organisation representing libraries and information services in Ghana. It was founded in 1962 by the West African Library Association (WALA). Eve Evans had started the WALA and she was to have an important role in creating a library service in Ghana.

The GLA is a registered professional association established under the Professional Bodies Decree NRCD 143 of 1973 with Registered No. PB 21 on 2 August 1986 in accordance with the laws of Ghana. It publishes the Ghana Library Journal, a peer-reviewed journal of Library science. The association has been in existence for over 54 years. It went through a period of activity and inactivity in the 1970s, but since 1983 it has been revived and growing steadily.

The Association has an elected governing council for a two-year tenure, chaired by the President, who sees to the running of the association.

The 20th President of the Association was Mrs. Comfort Asare, who was the acting Librarian at Wisconsin International University College. The 21st President of the Association is Mr. Kodjo Antwi, the Librarian at the Kofi Annan International Peacekeeping Training Centre.

== Membership ==
- Fellow
- Chartered Member
- Associate member
- Student
- Retired Member
- Life Member
- Ordinary Member

== Membership of Professional Bodies ==
The Association is a member of the following professional bodies:

- International Federation of Library Associations (IFLA)
- African Library and Information Associations and Institutions (AfLIA)

== List of Presidents ==
Number	Name	Tenure
1st	Mr. R. G. M. Pitcher	1962-1963
2nd	Mr. E. K. Koranteng	1963-1964
3rd	Mr. A. G. T. Ofori	1963-1964
4th	Mr. E. K. Amedeke	1965-1967
5th	Mr. David E. M. Odoi	1967-1969
6th	Mr. David Cornelius	1969-1971
7th	Mr. A. N. De Heer	1971-1977
8th	Mr. G. C. O. Lamptey	1977-1983
9th	Mr. J. A. Villars	1983-1988
10th	Mr. Samson Afre	1988-1990
11th	Mr. Daniel B. Addo	1990-1992
12th	Nana Asiedu	1992-1996
13th	Mrs. Matilda Amissah-Arthur	1996-1998
14th	Mr. Clement Entsua-Mensah	1998-2002
15th	Helena R. Asamoah-Hassan	2002-2006
16th	Mrs. Valentina J. A. Bannerman	2006-2010
17th	Mr. Albert K. A. Fynn	2010-2012
18th	Mrs. Perpetua S. Dadzie	2013-2016
19th	Mr. Samuel Bentil Aggrey	2017-2021
20th	Mrs Comfort Asare	2021-2024
21st	Mr Kodjo Asafo-Adjei Antwi	2024-date

== Ghana Library Journal ==
Ghana Library Journal
- Discipline: Information science
- Language: English
- Edited by: Monica Mensah Danquah

Publication details
- History: 1963–present
- Publisher: Ghana Library Association (Ghana)
- Frequency: Biannual
- Open access: Yes
- License: CC-BY 4.0

Standard abbreviations
- ISO 4: Ghana Libr. J.

Indexing
- ISSN: 0855-3033

Links
- Journal homepage; Online access; Online archive

Ghana Library Journal is a biannual double-blind peer-reviewed academic journal published by the Ghana Library Association. The journal publishes open access scholarly articles in different aspects of Library and Information Science which are intended for library professionals and educators, information scientists as well as students. As a diamond open access journal, manuscript published in the journal are licensed under Creative Commons Attribution 4.0 (CC BY 4.0). The editor of the journal is Monica Mensah Danquah.

The journal is abstracted and indexed in African Journals Online (AJOL) and Sabinet African Journals.

== See also ==
- Ghana Library Board
- Eve Evans

== Bibliography ==
- Anaba Alemna (2006). "Current Information Issues and Developments in Ghana". Alexandria. 18. UK. ISSN 0955-7490.
