= Ghana Library Authority =

Public library service of Ghana

The Ghana Library Authority, established in 1950 as the Ghana Library Board, was the first public library service in sub-Saharan Africa. The public library movement in Ghana began in 1928, as a personal effort of the then Anglican Bishop Orfeur Anglionby of Accra. In 1946, the Aglionby Library Management Committee worked with the British Council Advisory Committee, towards library development in the then Gold Coast. In 2018 President Nana Addo Dankwa Akufo Addo appointed a Ghanaian Social Entrepreneur, Hayford Siaw as GhLA Chief Executive Officer. In May 2021, the Authority was shortlisted for the LBF International Excellence Awards in the 'Library of the Year' Category. Alhassan Betintiche Ziblim assumed office as the new Chief Executive Officer of the Ghana Library Authority in 2025 under the President John Mahama Administration.

== History ==
The public library movement in Ghana began in 1928, as a personal effort of the then Anglican Bishop Orfeur Anglionby of Accra who succeeded in building a small library at the Bishop's House with book donated by church members in England for reading and borrowing by the public. The work of the Committee resulted in the passing of the Gold Coast Library Board Ordinance Cap 118, in December, 1949, which became operational on 1 January 1950.

It assumed responsibility for the Anglionby Library, which had been started by John Aglionby, the Anglican bishop of Accra, and the British Council's library service led by Eve Evans.It served as a model for other public library services in Africa. The British Council handed over its Librarian, Miss E. J. A. Evans, and a stock of 27,000 books to start the public library service. This volumes of books were housed in a wing of the King George V Memorial Hall which later became the parliament house for the first, second and third republics. The year 1950 was a significant landmark in the history of public library service in Ghana under the Gold Coast Library Board Ordinance (Cap 118), which was passed by the legislation council in 1949 and came into force in 1950. The Ordinance was later re-enacted as the Ghana Library Board Act 372 in 1970.

Act 327 charges the Ghana Library Authority to establish, equip, manage and maintain public libraries in Ghana; take all such steps as may be necessary to discharge such functions; and to give effect to the principles and provisions of this act. Aside this function, Ghana Library Authority is to conduct in service training courses, seminars and workshops for school Library Assistants and tutor Librarians; visiting schools periodically to inspect and ensure that employee in these libraries are performing to the required standards; and reorganising school and college libraries and helping institutions interested in setting up libraries in their communities.

In April 2026 a Technical Committee was formed to review Act 327 to strengthen the legal and institutional framework for library services in Ghana.

== Directors ==
Evelyn Evans was the first Director of Ghana Library Board. The Acting Chief Executive Officer of the Authority is Ziblim Alhassan, appointed in June 2025 by the Mahama administration.

=== Former directors ===
- 2018 to 2025 - Hayford Siaw
- 2016 to 2017 - Rebecca Odua Akita
- 2014 to 2016 - Kwaku Ofosu-Tenkorang
- 2013 to 2014 - Adjei N. O. Apenten
- 2011 to 2013 - Omari Mensah Tenkorang
- 2004 to 2011 - Ekua Techie Menson
- 2001 to 2003 - Susannah Minyila
- 1999 to 2000 - Rose B. Bofah
- 1996 to 1999 - Sarah D. Kanda
- 1992 to 1996 - Juliana Sackey
- 1982 to 1992 - David Cornelius
- 1966 to 1982 - A. G. T. Ofori
- 1950 to 1965 - Evelyn J. A. Evans

== Award ==
In May 2021, the Ghana Library Authority was awarded the ‘Library of the Year’ at the London Book Fair (LBF) International Excellence Awards.

== Branches ==
The Anglionby Library was a huge success, therefore a committee was set up. The committee approached the Commonwealth Education and Welfare Trust for money to build more branches especially children's library. The Trust offered £3,000 for the provision of three libraries in Accra. The donated money was used to build the Osu, Accra Central and Kaneshie. In 1975, there was 17 branches across the country. As at 2019, there were 73 public libraries under Ghana Library Authority.

=== Greater Accra Region ===
==== Accra Central Library ====
It shared its premises with the headquarters of the Ghana Library Authority. It was established in 1946 in former Parliament House. The present premises was officially opened on 17 May 1956 by the governor Sir Charles Arden Clarke, the prime minister, and the president of the British Library Association. The Accra Central Library is located on the High Street, Thorpe Road.

==== Tema Municipal Library ====
The Tema Branch Library was opened on 9 November 1962 at the Community Centre at Community One in Tema and moved to its current location on 9 January 2003. The library was renovated and reopened in 2019 by Karpowership Company. The library renders lending, reference and ICT services to the public. It goes on outreach to basic schools and renders book box service to some basic schools in the Municipality. It is located at adjacent to the Tema Senior High School.

==== Dansoman Community Library ====
The Dansoman Branch Library was founded in 1984 as a children's Library. The library is located in the premises of the Dansoman Keep Fit Club. The current building can no longer cater for the population and for that matter, MTN Foundation is constructing a new library complex for the Dansoman Community to be able to cater for both adult and Children at Ebenezer Senior High School.

==== Lartebiokorshie Community Library ====
The Library started in the last nineties at the residence of Madam Juliana Sackey, former Director of Ghana Library. The current location was opened on 15 May 2013. It was the first library renders service to inmates of the Senior Correctional Centre at Roman Ridge and offers book box services to some schools. It also runs an Adolescent health outreach programme in collaboration with the Planned Parenthood Association of Ghana and Mamprobi Polyclinic Adolescent Corner to curb the menace of teenage pregnancy within the community.

==== Osu Community Library ====
The Osu children's Library was opened in 1950. It also organises reading competitions among school children during their long vacation It is located right behind the Osu Commercial Bank in Accra.

==== Teshie Community Library ====
The Teshie branch library started around 1990 in a rented premise at Teshie. Operations in the current building which was put up the Member of Parliament common fund in 2006 but had a structural defects so the library was closed to the public in 2010. The Ledzokuku Krowor Municipal Assembly (LEKMA) worked on the building until 2015 when most of the defects have been corrected, thereafter was opened again to the general public. The library is located near the Southern Cluster of Schools in Teshie and it is about 100 meters from the Teshie Family Health Hospital.

==== Dodowa Community Library ====
The Dodowa Branch Library was established in November 1961 through the initiative of Messrs. E. T. Mensah and Johnson. They applied to the then Director of Ghana Library Board for the facility. The library was started at Lower Dodowa in a rented apartment on the ground floor of a storey building, under the care of a resident who was later trained to become the Library Assistant in charge. It was later relocated in 1977 to its current place which used to be a clinic. The facility is currently undergoing renovation by the Shai-Osudoku District Assembly.

- Frafraha Library

==== George Padmore Research Library on African Affairs ====
- It was created in 1961 by Dr. Kwame Nkrumah, former President of Ghana. The Research Library was symbolic of what was happening and play important role in furthering the aims of the struggle.
- National Children's Library

=== Volta Region ===
- Hohoe Library - 1 July 1958
- Keta Branch Library - opened on 27 February 1960.
- Agbozume Community Library
- Jasikan Library - 1 July 1958
- Ho Library
- Anloga Library
- Kpando Library - 1 July 1958
- Peki Library - 1 July 1973
- Tsito Library - established in November 1963

=== Ashanti Region ===
- Obuasi Municipal Library - 13 October 1969
- Ashanti Regional Library - opened as Branch Library in July, 1951 and gained regional library status on 30 June 1954.
- Effiduase Library
- Konongo/Odumase Library - it was opened in July 1959
- Ashtown Library
- Bantama Library
- Nana Yaw Baah Library, Krofrom
- Chirapatre Library
- Kumawu Branch Library

=== Central Region ===
- Cape Coast Central Library - gained Regional status on 1 July 1970, but opened as a branch in December 1951
- Abura Dunkwa Library - 17 August 1957
- Apam Library
- Aquarium Library
- Elmina Library - It was established in September 1970
- Winneba Library
- Twifo Praso Library
- Dunkwa-On-Offin Library
- Ajumako Library

=== Eastern Region ===
- Eastern Regional Library
- AKim Oda Library - 13 December 1962
- Nkawkaw Library - Officially opened on 24 April 1970
- Akim Swedru Branch Library
- Koforidua Children's Library
- Abetifi Branch Library
- Asokore Branch Library
- Suhyen Branch Library
- Apeguso Branch Library
- Oyoko Branch Library
- Abiriw Branch Library
- Jumapo Branch Library
- J. B. Danquah Memorial Library - Kibi
- Suhum Branch Library
- Effiduase Branch Library
- Kukurantumi Branch Library

=== Northern, North-East and Savannah Region ===
- Northern Regional Library-was initially established as a Branch in August 1955 (and on 21 August 1964, was elevated and officially commissioned to the status of the Regional library).
- Damongo Library - It was opened in April 1959
- Gambaga Library - It was opened in August 1968
- Mandari Community Library - It was opened in September 2021

== Bono, Bono East and Ahafo Region ==
Bono Region

- Regional Library
- Dormaa Library
- Sunyani Children's Library - 20 March 1970
- Duadaso Library
- Wenchi Branch Library

Bono East Region

- Techiman Library
- Kintampo Library

Ahafo Region

- Goaso Library
- Duayaw Nkwanta

=== Upper East Region ===
- Bolgatanga Library
- Sandema Library
- Bongo Library
- Navrongo Library

=== Western and Western North Region ===
- Sekondi Library - it was opened on 19 September 1952 however in July 1956, it became the Western Regional Library.
- Takoradi Library
- Axim Library - 1 July 1971
- Bibiani Library
- Sefwi Wiawso Library
- Tarkwa Library - 6 July 1956

=== Upper West Region ===
- Wa Library - It was opened in January 1960

== Sections ==
The objectives of the Ghana Library Authority is to provide materials for educational support, in the areas of both formal or informal education, in order to have a mass of informed citizens in the country and act as a centre for the dissemination of information of any kind and by any means, such as books, newspapers, magazines; to provide facilities for study and research. Additional objectives include active participation in community activities, with the provision of information to fill specific needs, and to promote and encourage a reading culture in the country..These sections were created to fulfill the objectives.

=== Lending ===
The Lending section serves adult and student users. It provides books for lending to registered users. It also renders Interlibrary Loans, Reservation, Referral and Current Awareness services. It observes UN days with exhibitions and displays. It organizes Outreach Programmes for selected Senior High Schools, Readers Club, Research and French Literacy services to the public.

=== References ===
The Reference section room provided for study and research. It admits only adult and student users. objective of the Reference Library is to provide the right information to the right person at the right time. It has sitting capacity of 125. It opens from 9am to 5pm from Monday to Saturday. It offers current awareness services, selective dissemination of information, interlibrary loan, library orientation and referral services. Its resources include books, newspapers, periodicals, pamphlets, government publications, laws and historic maps.

=== Children ===
The Children's section offers library services to children especially from pre-school to Junior High school. Its objective is to promote the reading habit among children and establish the foundation for life-long learning. The library has a reference corner which provides opportunity for children to do their homework. This corner was equipped with computers to serve the technology needs of children. The library organizes children's programmes such as story hour, film shows and other literacy related activities. The importance of work with children necessitated the putting up of a summer hut where some of the children's activities like drama and story hour could be shifted to accommodate the growing population of users. The book stock includes reference and African collections. The library has artefacts, drawings and assorted educational games.

=== Extension ===
The extension section was created in 1960 to cater for the deprive and unserved communities that do not have access to physical libraries. in view of this, the Mobile Library Service was introduced.. The Mobile Library complements the efforts of the static libraries by reaching out to clients who cannot visit the library regularly to borrow books to read at home. It provides lending services through the Book Box Service. This service is particularly suitable for families, institutions/organizations, identifiable groups, societies and clubs. The Mobile Library service is the most popularly acclaimed pro-poor, rural, outreach, public library service programme in Ghana. The Mobile Library services also embarks on ICT Classes for selected basic schools that do not have computer for their practical lessons in the communities across the country and this initiative is supported by EIFL.

== Projects/Activities/Support ==
- Ghana Library Authority recently launched an e-learning project Read2Skill. The objective of the project is to enable Ghanaians have the opportunity to undertake courses on the world largest open learning platform, Udemy.
- GhLA Scholastic.
- National Short Story Writing Challenge.
- The Ghana National Council of Private Schools (GNACOPS), in collaboration with the Ghana Library Authority (GhLA) and the Parliament of Ghana held "Parliament Reads 2020" under the theme “Inspiring the Next Generation Leaders to be Readers.
- Ghana Library Authority declares 2020 as "Year of Learning"
- Library Authority Extends Operations to Abuakwa North Municipality.
- Library Authority receives vehicles from government.
- Library Authority secures license for 1000 Ghanaians to study on Coursera.
- Ghana Library Authority extends services to Jaman North Municipality.
- Refurbished Children's’ Library in Sunyani Commissioned.
- Eastern Regional Library Launched "Seventy4seventy" Project.
- Kyebi Traditional Leaders hand over J.B Danquah Memorial Centre to GhLA.
- Ghana Library has established 64 Reading Clubs in the Volta and Oti Regions.
- Eastern Regional Library Launched STEM Study Hub.
- Ghana Library Authority Refurbished Children's Libraries.
- Ghana Library Launched Children's Corner in the Northern Region.

== Current board members ==
As of 2025 Governing Board members of the Ghana Library Authority include:

List of Current Board Members
No	Name	Position	Representing	Duration
1	Dr. Michael Ato Essuman	Chairperson	Minister's nominee	2025-date
2	Mr. Ziblim Alhassan Betintiche	Secretary/CEO	Acting Executive Director, Ghana Library Authority	2025-date
3	Mr. Richard Baffour Awuah	Member	Minister of Education nominee	2025-date
4	Prof. Philip Kankam	Member	Representative, Department of Information Studies, University of Ghana	2025-date
5	Dr. Yaw Owusu-Agyeman	Member	Institute of Adult Education, University of Ghana	2025-date
6	Mrs. Judith Emefa Quarshie	Member	Ministry of Local Government	2025-date
7	Mr. Vincent Esoah	Member	Conference of Heads of Assisted Secondary Schools (CHASS)	2025-date
8	Mr. Dennis Osei-Owusu	Member	National Teaching Council	2025-date
9	Mr. Churchill Nartey Darlington	Member	Department of Social Welfare	2025-date
10	Rev. Fr. Gabriel Kojovi Liashiedze	Member	Christian Council of Ghana	2025-date
11	Dr. Mohammed Marzuq Abubakari	Member	Office of National Chief Imam	2025-date
12	Rev. Dr. Cyril Gershon Kwao Fayose	Member	National Catholic Secretariat	2025-date
13	Mr. Joseph Nerboi Tetteh	Member	Ministry of Communications, Digital Technology and Innovations	2025-date
14	Mr. Daniel Affadu	Member	Ghana National Association of Teachers (GNAT)	2025-date
15	Ms. Salome Odoom	Member	Ministry of Education nominee	2025-date

=== Previous Board Chairpersons ===
List of Previous Board Chairpersons
No	Name	Duration
1	W. A. Stewart Cole, Esquire	1949 to 1950
2	Prof. L. J. Lewis	1951 to 1952
3	Mr W. A. S. Cole	1953 to 1954
4	Mr A. C. Walker	1955 to 1956
5	Mr E. Akufo Addo	1957 to 1958
6	Mr. H. Millar-Craig	1959 to 1960
7	Mr C. T. Nylander	1960 to 1961
8	Mrs S. Al-Hassan	1962 to 1965
9	Prof. L. H. Ofosu-Appiah	1966 to 1972
10	Mrs Frances Ademola	1972 to 1975
11	Prof. Anaba A. Alemna	2001 to 2004
12	Hon. Kosi Kedem	2009 to 2013

== Regional Librarians ==
- Mr. Alikem Cudjoe Tamakloe - Greater Accra
- Mr. Aaron Kuwornu - Northern, North East and Savannah
- Madam Elizabeth Arthur - Ashanti
- Mr Guy Ebenezer Amarteifio - Volta and Oti
- Mr. Leslie Kansanga - Upper East
- Mr. Evans Korletey-Tene - Eastern
- Mr. Augustine Rogatus Votere - Upper West
- Mr. Harold Appiah Kubi - Central
- Mr. Ofosu Frimpong - Bono, Bono East and Ahafo
- Mr. Philip Asamoa - Western and Western North

== See also ==
- Ghana Library Association
