= Evelyn Evans =

Founded libraries in Ghana and elsewhere

Evelyn Evans CBE
- Born: Evelyn Alice Jane Evans; 22 March 1910; Coventry, England
- Died: 2005 (aged 94–95)
- Occupation: Librarian
- Known for: Founding the Ghana Library Board and other library services

Evelyn "Eve" Alice Jane Evans CBE (22 March 1910 – 2005) was a British librarian who founded libraries in Ghana and elsewhere.

== Life ==
Evans was born in Coventry in 1910. She worked for the local public library service from 1927. In 1933, she became a fellow of the Library Association. In 1935, she was in Ann Arbor working at the library of the University of Michigan. She returned to Coventry and was employed at the Public Library until 1941.

From 1945, she was working in the Gold Coast as the librarian for the British Council. In 1946, John Aglionby, Bishop of Accra, donated £1000 of his own money to found the Ghana Library Board. Evans was promoted to the Gold Coast Library Board in 1949 and served in that capacity for just a year, when it was recognised by statute. She started the first library service, and she became the first chief librarian in the Gold Coast. She later became the first director of Library Services. She was an advisor to UNESCO, and in this capacity she advised the emerging library services in Nigeria, Sierra Leone and Ghana. In 1954, she helped form the West Africa Library Association in Ghana, and four years later she was the association's president. The WALA created the Ghana Library Association in 1962.

While in Ghana, Evans became close friends with Erica Powell, who had an unusual role as the president's private secretary and constant companion.

In 1960, EVans' MBE of 1955 was upgraded to a CBE.

In 1961, she went on a "world tour" of libraries, visiting many in Africa and other emerging countries.

In 1964, she published A Tropical Library Service: The Story of Ghana's Libraries.

She left her role in the Gold Coast in 1965. Since her arrival in 1945, the Gold Coast had gone from no libraries to over twenty. She had developed a library service for children, and she had always planned that the service would eventually not be run by the British.

In 1967, she was in Libya and Ceylon for UNESCO. She remained in Ceylon until 1970, by which time she had designed the legislation that would create the Ceylon National Library Services Board.

In 1975, she was invited back to Ghana to join in the celebrations of the 25th anniversary of the library service she had initiated. The 1950 Ghana Library Board Act had not only created the service, but it had committed the government to support it. Ghana was said to have had the first national library service in sub-Saharan Africa, which was a model for other countries.

Evans died in 2005.

== Accomplishments and recognition ==
Evans made substantial progress establishing a legal and organisational framework, as well as a national library service with a number of libraries aimed at both adults and children. She is particularly noted for her opposition to the established missionary and colonial educationalists in their selection of books aimed at children, arguing that the children's titles "would have depressed any children's library".

Evans also spent five years in Ghana arguing that they needed a "proper library" system, but that definition was never defined. She assumed that the country needed a library system identical to the one she had seen in Britain. An alternative bottom-up approach was proposed and tried by a young Ugandan named William Serwadda in Uganda. He created an approach that he planned would exploit radio to deliver literacy, but he lacked the political backing that Evans enjoyed.

Ghana's first president, Kwame Nkrumah, gave speeches supporting Evans. He opened libraries and wrote an introduction for her 1964 book.
