= Erica Powell =

- fair use image
- Born: 15 March 1921; Brighton
- Died: 5 June 2007 (aged 86); Peterborough
- Known for: Presidential secretary

Erica Powell OBE (15 March 1921 – 5 June 2007) was a British Private Secretary to Kwame Nkrumah, President of Ghana and later to Siaka Stevens, President of Sierra Leone. She was a controversial figure, who was suspected by the British and by Ghanaians of lack of loyalty, and to have been too close to Nkrumah. She ghost wrote Nkrumah's autobiography, while also writing her own interesting biography, which was eventually published, after Nkrumah's death.

== Life ==
Powell was born in Brighton on 15 March 1921 into a middle-class family. She trained to be a secretary and then to teach. She came top of her class during the 1940 London Chamber of Commerce Shorthand and Typewriting exams. She went on to be employed by Barclays Bank, during the second world war.

On the rebound from a failed romance with a farmer in Lincolnshire, she accepted an offer in February 1952, from the Crown Agents for the Colonies. They offered her the position of "Private Secretary (Female)/Gold Coast". She said that an attractive swimsuit got her the job of Private Secretary to the Governor of the Gold Coast, Sir Charles Arden-Clarke. While working for the Governor, she became a close friend and confidant of Kwame Nkrumah, then bidding for Ghana's independence from the United Kingdom. Her closeness to Nkrumah led to her being dismissed in 1954, and being sent back to the UK.

Powell returned to Ghana in January 1955, to work for Kwame Nkrumah, a position she held for ten years. During that time she largely wrote Nkumah's (auto)biography, although this was not admitted until much later. She became close friends with the leading librarian Evelyn Evans, who provided calm during periods of stress. Other expatriates in Ghana included Dorothy Hodgkin, who visited her husband Thomas and Conor Cruise O'Brien. Her close relationship and loyalty to Nkrumah bred a lot of rumours, both in Ghana and the UK. It also brought a lot of resentment from various quarters. She was accused of being a foreign spy whilst in Ghana. Nkrumah married an Egyptian even though they had no common language. He complained of being intensely lonely to Powell and wrote to her in 1965, saying "Did I ever tell you that I married not for myself but for the presidency?" Powell kept in contact with Nkrumah after he was removed from power, while he was in exile in Guinea until his death in April, 1972.

Powell was made an MBE in 1958 and OBE in 1960.

She later worked for Siaka Stevens as his private secretary from 1970 to 1979. She attended Nkrumah's funeral in 1972, as part of the official Sierra Leone delegation.

In 1984, she published her autobiography, Private Secretary (Female)/Gold Coast. The title was drawn from the advertisement that she had applied to, in the 1950s. The biography was delayed for some years because Nkrumah objected to the tone of the initial drafts. It was noted that missing sections of letters hinted that she had a very close relationship with Nkrumah.

Powell died in Peterborough on 5 June 2007. Her obituary was covered by the Times and BBC Radio.
