= Helena Asamoah-Hassan =

Ghanaian librarian

Dr. Helena Asamoah-Hassan
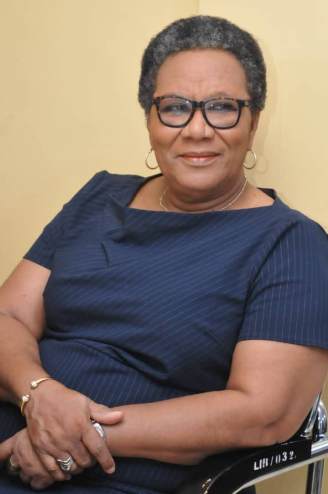
- Born: Cape Coast, Ghana
- Occupation: Librarian
- Website: web.aflia.net

Helena R. Asamoah-Hassan (born 1950s, Cape Coast) is a Ghanaian librarian who is the present executive director of African Library and Information Associations and Institutions (AfLIA), the board chair for the Ghana Library Authority and the secretary general of African Regional Memory of the World Committee.

== Career ==
She is the immediate past University Librarian of the Kwame Nkrumah University of Science and Technology (KNUST). President of the Ghana Library Association from 2002 to 2006, and the first president of the African Library and Information Associations and Institutions (AfLIA). She served as the Chairperson of the International Advisory Committee for UNESCO’s Memory of the World Programme 2013 – 2015. A member of the IFLA Governing Board 2010 - 2012 and the Chairperson of the Management Committee of the Consortium of Academic and Research Libraries in Ghana (CARLIGH) as well as a founding member from March 2004 to 2013.

=== Positions held ===
- Treasurer, UST Branch of UTAG, January 1999 to 2001
- Treasurer, UTAG National, September 1999 to 2001
- Member, Board of Governors, Konongo Odumasi Secondary School, (KOSS) February 1998 to 2014.
- Member, Executive Committee of UST Branch of UTAG, January 1997 to December 1998.
- Commissioner, National Media Commission of Ghana, 2003 to 2006
- Member, Board of Directors, New Times Corporation, Ghana, May 2011 to 2013

== Education ==
Asamoah-Hassan attended the Breman Asikuma Roman Catholic School and Howard Memorial Primary School in Takoradi, and continued at the Nyaniba Middle Boarding School in Nkroful and then to Konongo Odumasi Secondary School for her secondary education. She studied Library Science at Ahmadu Bello University, Zaria, Nigeria (1977) for a bachelor's degree. She obtained her Master of Arts Degree in Library Studies from the University of Ghana in 1981, and a PhD from the Kwame Nkrumah University of Science and Technology in 2011.

== Publications ==
Asamoah-Hassan has written 96 papers, some of which include:

- Growth of African Research, Equity in Access and Dissemination of African content - the Catalysts.
- AfLIA and Library Human Capital Development for Africa’s development.
- The Consortium of Academic and Research Libraries in Ghana (CARLIGH)- History & Way Forward. Presented at a CARLIGH meeting held in Accra in March 2019
- The African Library and Information Association (AfLIA). Presented at the GLA Conference in Accra, 6 December 2017
- Contribution of Libraries to Development in Africa. Presented at the Side Event of the UN High Level Political Forum on Sustainable Development, New York, USA, June 2017
- The Scholarly e-Information Access in Ghana – An Overview. Presented at the UNESCO –CERN Workshop held at KNUST, Kumasi, in December 2016
- UN agenda 2030: Sustainable Development Goals and Libraries. Presented at the International Workshop on UN Agenda 2030 and AU Agenda 2063 held at the Balme Library, University of Ghana, Legon, 5th – 6 May 2016
- The Library and the Scholarly Community. Presented at the Collaborative Publishing Workshop organised by PKP/CARLIGH on 4 May 2016 at CSIR INSTI, Accra
- Sustaining CoP with a Strategic Plan. Presented at the Volta River Authority (VRA) of Ghana Staff held at Akosombo, 21 March 2016
- Library Landscape in Ghana. Presented Online to Students of Melanie Sellar of San Jose University, USA on 2 November 2015.
- INELI – Sub Saharan Africa (INELI-SSA): Plans and Prospects. Presented at Global INELI meeting held at the Bill & Melinda Foundation Offices, Seattle, USA in May 2015 .
- Asamoah-Hassan, Helena R. (1996-09-27), Women Creating a Sturdy Foundation for Social Growth
- Asamoah-Hassan, Helena R. (1997-03-27), Violence against Women
- Asamoah-Hassan, Helena R. (1997-04-30), Gender and Development
- Asamoah-Hassan, Helena R. (1997-06-06). "An Archives for a University in Sub-Saharan Africa: The Case for the University of Science and Technology, Kumasi". Journal of Science and Technology (Ghana). 17 (1 & 2): 23–31. ISSN 3057-3629.
- Asamoah-Hassan, Helena R. (1997-09-01). "Information for the Rural Person in Ghana: strategies for dissemination". Information Development. 13 (3): 122–127. doi:10.1177/0266666974238717. ISSN 0266-6669.
- Asamoah-Hassan, Helena (5 June 1998). "A library ready for 21st century services?: a case of the university of science and technology library, Kumasi, Ghana". Purdue University e-Pubs.
- Asamoah-Hassan, Helena R. (1998-10-28), Widowhood Practices among the Akan of Ghana - Yesterday and Today
- Asamoah-Hassan, Helena R. (2001-12-07). "Strengthening the Capacities of Women of the West African Sub-Region for Peace Building".
- Asamoah-Hassan, Helena R. (2002-06-27), University Library Partnerships And Funding In West Africa
- Asamoah–Hassan, Helena R. (2003), Information: The Oil in the Wheel of National Development
- Asamoah-Hassan, Helena R. (2006-01-30), An Informed Youth in a Competitive Global World - a Dependable Partner in Decision-Making
- Asamoah-Hassan, Helena (2007-07-05), "Embracing Electronic Scholarly Publishing in Africa; The Kwame Nkrumah University of Science and Technology (KNUST) Library, Kumasi, Ghana as a Case Study", PKP Scholarly Publishing Conference 2007, archived from the original on 2023-10-29
- Asamoah‐Hassan, Helena (2010-01-01). "Alternative scholarly communication: management issues in a Ghanaian university". Library Management. 31 (6): 420–426. doi:10.1108/01435121011066171. ISSN 0143-5124.
- Asamoah-Hassan, Helena R. (2011-09-02), Starting a new scholarly journal: the library's role in promoting scholarly publishing
- Asamoah-Hassan, Helena R. (2011-09-02), Transforming Anglophone Library Associations in West Africa
- Memory of the World (MoW) Programme – a Summary Paper presented at the UNESCO Forum, WLIC/ IFLA Conference in Milan, Italy (2009).

== Awards ==
- 2012 BioMed Central's Open Access Advocate of the Year
- IFLA Service Medal – International Federation of Library Associations and Institutions ( IFLA), 2012
- Certificate of Honour and Life Member, Ahmadu Bello University, Zaria, Nigeria, Society of Library Science Students, from June 1988.
- Fellow, Ghana Library Association, 2006
