= Jenny Glennie =

South African educator (1950–2025)

Jennifer (Jenny) Anne Glennie (1950–2025) pioneered distance education in South Africa and was widely respected as a champion of Higher Education in South Africa, committed to “expanding access to equity and justice in education”. She was killed in a car accident on Tuesday, 2 December 2025.

== Biography ==
In 1992, Glennie founded SAIDE (South African Institute for Distance Education) , a distance education institution which facilitated the development of the National Professional Diploma in Education (NPDE) Under her leadership, Glennie created educational opportunities for poor and marginalised groups, by promoting access, equity, and innovation through Siyaphumelela (we succeed), a data analytics initiative launched in 2014. Her contribution to education was also felt through a social publishing project entitled African Storybook

== Recognition ==
Glennie’s work was internationally recognised

- 2002 - Fellow of the International Commonwealth of Learning.
- 2007 - Chancellor’s Medal from the University of Pretoria for her contribution to education.
- 2024 - African Council for Distance Education Legacy Service Award for exceptional contribution to the field of Open Distance and e-learning.
- 2025 - Honorary Doctorate in Education from Wits University
