= OER Africa =

International project focused on open educational resources

OER Africa is an initiative of SAIDE, established in 2008 with support from the William and Flora Hewlett Foundation, to collaborate with higher education institutions in Africa in the development and use of Open Educational Resources (OER), to enhance teaching and learning.

== Activities ==
Currently, OER Africa is

- Developing continuous professional development (CPD) frameworks for supporting OER practices in higher education institutions in Africa.
- Identifying, evaluating and sharing CPD OER available from institutions around the world.
- Establishing working partnerships with selected African universities to identify the most appropriate strategies to strengthen the policy and operational environments.

Regular, up-to-date communications on news and events relating to OER in African higher education are provided on the website.

OER Africa has been cited recently in EdTechHub, TESSA, Policy Commons, Open Praxis, and PLoS One

== Partner organizations ==
- African Library and Information Associations and Institutions (AfLIA)

== See also ==
- Education in Africa
- Open Source
