= Jacinta Were =

Kenyan librarian

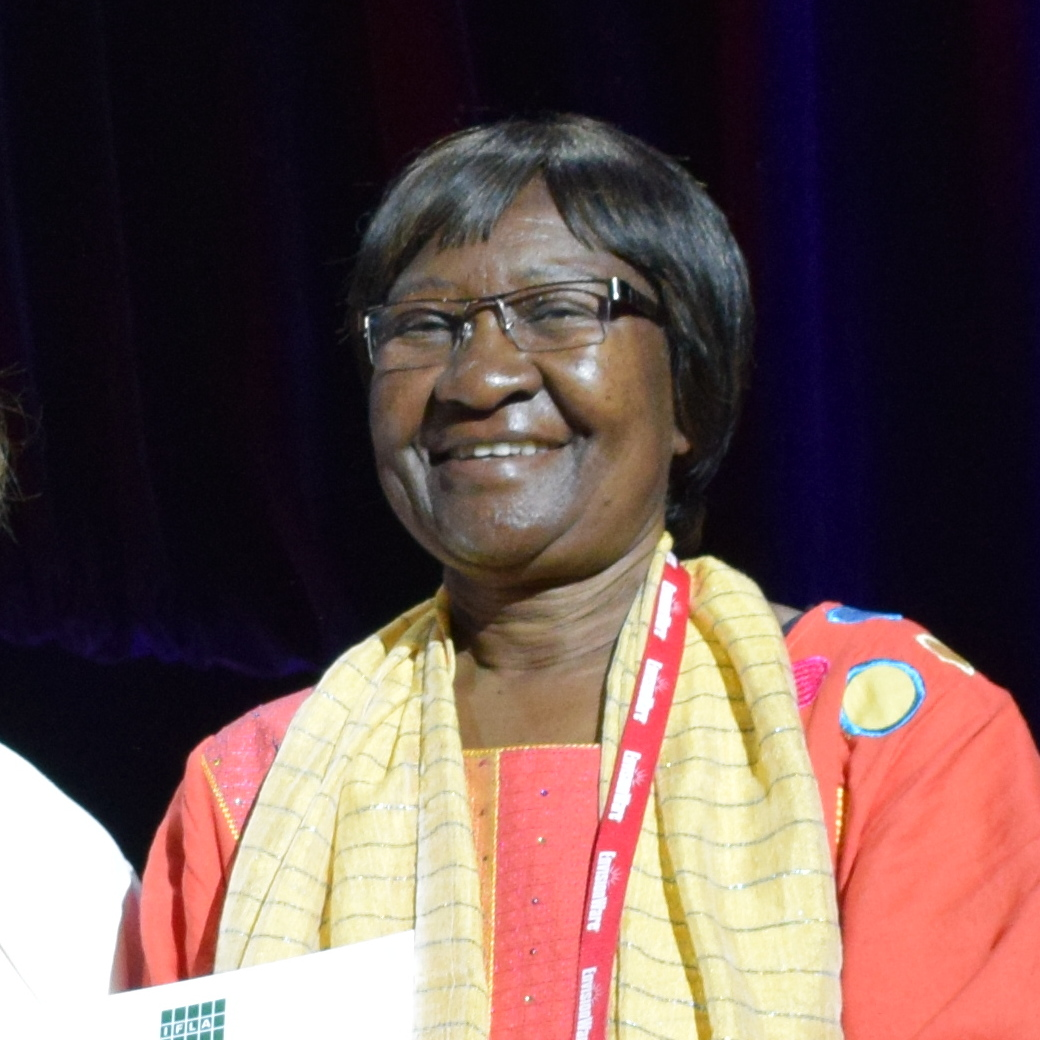
Were in 2016 at the closing session of the 2016 IFLA Annual Conference

Jacinta Were is a Kenyan librarian. Were has specialised in the management of electronic libraries over the 30 years of her career in librarianship.

Were has served as Deputy Director of the University of Nairobi Library at the University of Nairobi in Kenya. Were has trained many professional librarians in Africa and is a pioneer in the promotion and automisation of libraries in Africa.

The digital repository of the University of Nairobi was created with her supervision and under her leadership.

Were founded the Kenya Library and Information Services Consortium. The consortium provide services to over 100 educational bodies in Kenya.

Were serves on the Governing Board of the African Library & Information Associations & Institutions (AfLIA) and is a board member of the International Federation of Library Associations and Institutions (IFLA).

Were received the IFLA Scroll of Appreciation at the closing session of the 2016 IFLA Annual Conference for her "...distinguished service to IFLA especially in supporting the development of librarians and as a pioneer of computer technology in libraries in Kenya and Africa".

Were's System Requirements of Computer-based Library System for University of Nairobi Library was published in 1986.
