= Mowbray O'Rorke =

British Anglican bishop (1869–1953)

The Right Reverend Mowbray O'Rorke
- Bishop of Accra
- Diocese: Anglican Diocese of Accra
- In office: 1913 to 1924
- Predecessor: Temple Hamlyn
- Successor: John Aglionby

Orders
- Ordination: 1902 (deacon); 1903 (priest)
- Consecration: c. 1913

Personal details
- Born: 21 May 1869
- Died: 15 March 1953 (aged 83)
- Denomination: Anglicanism

Mowbray Stephen O'Rorke (21 May 1869 – 15 March 1953) was an Anglican bishop in Africa in the first quarter of the 20th century.

== Ordained ministry ==
O'Rorke was ordained Deacon in 1902 and Priest in 1903. He served curacies at St Paul's, Jarrow, St Margaret's, Durham, and St Oswald's, Durham. He then moved to Australia and became Priest in charge of St Paul's Cathedral, Rockhampton, Queensland.

In 1911 he was elevated to the episcopate as the second Bishop of Accra. Resigning in 1924, he was Rector of Blakeney, Norfolk, Guardian of the Shrine at Our Lady of Walsingham, and then Chaplain at King's College, Taunton until his retirement in 1939.

== Personal life ==
O'Rorke was born on 21 May 1869, in Birmingham, Warwickshire, England to William Joseph O'Rorke (1835–1924) and Annie Elizabeth née Wilson (1840–1912). He was educated at Trinity College, Dublin.

He had a sister, Annie Elizabeth (1874–1962), and four brothers, including:

- The Rev Benjamin Garniss O'Rorke MA DSO (1875–1918), army chaplain and prisoner of war
- Lt Col Frederick Charles O'Rorke (1879–1976), who served with the Army Veterinary Corps on the Western Front, 1914–1919

Church of England titles
Preceded by Nathaniel Temple Hamlyn	Bishop of Accra; 1913 – 1924	Succeeded by John Orfeur Aglionby
