= William Serwadda =

William Serwadda (sometimes referred to as G.W. Serwadda) was a Ugandan librarian who served as the first director of the Uganda Library Service. He held the position between July 1964 and November 1966.

== Career ==
Between 1955 and 1957, Serwadda worked as a library assistant at Makerere University, after which he departed to undertake library studies in Britain.

After his studies, Serwadda visited a number of libraries in continental Europe, including Scandinavia, then came back to Uganda and was published in the East African Library Association Bulletin. He was appointed the first director of the Uganda Library Service in July 1964 after the designated appointee resigned.

== Published works ==
Serwadda has been quoted by a number of library scholars based on his work that was published in a number of journals. The publications drawn on include:

- "In my View" (published in the East African Library Association Bulletin, 5 January 1967, pp. 10–12)
- "The Development of Library Services in Uganda" (published in the East African Library Association Bulletin, 7 June 1966, pp. 26–28)

== See also ==
- Evelyn Evans
