= African Library and Information Associations and Institutions =

Non-profit organization based in Ghana

African Library and Information Associations and Institutions (AfLIA)
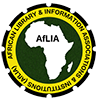
- Abbreviation: AfLIA
- Formation: 5 July 2013
- Type: International non-governmental organization, Non-profit
- Purpose: To empower the library and information community to actively promote the African development agenda through dynamic services that transform livelihoods.
- Headquarters: Accra, Ghana
- Region served: Africa
- Official language: English, French, Portuguese
- President: Prof. Rosemary Shafack
- Executive Director: Dr. Helena Asamoah-Hassan
- Website: web.aflia.net

The African Library and Information Associations and Institutions (AfLIA), commonly referred to as AfLIA, is an international not-for-profit organization headquartered in Accra, Ghana. The Association is registered under the laws of Ghana as an NGO. It is managed under the general guidelines of its Constitution and by-laws. The Institution is currently being led by Dr. Helena Asamoah-Hassan as the Executive Director.

== History ==
It is a fact that continuous educational, economic and socio-political disruptions hamper the delivery of library and information services in Africa whereas the role and impact of the African Library and Information Science (LIS) sector and its position in a developmental agenda is underestimated.

The disposition of governments and major stakeholders have consequently resulted in a seeming neglect of the library sector birthing many challenges including; budget cuts and inadequate funding for libraries. Given that national and global development imperatives are often advocated through the United Nations Agenda 2030, AU Agenda 2063 and National Developmental Agendas, there was the need for a continental Library Association to undertake high level strategic advocacy on behalf of the African LIS sector.

Continental library associations serve as growth and high-level advocacy bodies for the library and information profession. They represent important platforms to discuss issues and further the cause of the library and information sector, at the continental level. In Africa, the idea of having such an Association had been nursed and widely discussed by many prominent African library and information professionals for many years but it was not until 2013 that one was finally created.

In May 2011, a continental library conference for Africa was held in Muldersdrift, South Africa, with the theme; The Future of African Librarianship. This was the first African Library Summit and it brought under the same roof prominent African library and information professionals. Following a presentation by Dr. Helena Asamoah-Hassan at the Summit, a discussion ensued towards the need to form a continent-wide African Library Association which will provide a platform to discuss issues and further the cause of the library and information sector in Africa.

Upon consensus, the IFLA Africa Section was tasked to set up an Exploratory Committee whose mandate was to conduct a feasibility study, extensively consult key LIS stakeholders on the continent and to report findings back to the IFLA Africa Section. The Exploratory Committee, as mandated, submitted their report to the IFLA African Section during the Mid-Term Meeting of the IFLA Africa Section in February 2013 in Abuja, Nigeria. Results of the work done by the Exploratory Committee included but not limited to; a draft of AfLIA's constitution, proposal of the name of the Association, Vision, Mission, Governance Structure, Membership and membership criteria, proposed committees and working groups as well as funding sources for the sustenance of the Association.

Among other things, the committee's recommendation to form the African Library and Information Associations and Institutions (AfLIA), was accepted. Subsequently, an Interim Committee was selected at the Mid Term Meeting of the IFLA Africa Section to manage the affairs of the Association for two years (2013–2015). Members of the Interim Committee are considered as the founding Governing Council of the organization. Later that year (5 July 2013), AfLIA was officially launched as the library association of Africa during the 2nd African Library Summit hosted by the University of South Africa (UNISA) in Pretoria, South Africa. In 2014, the founding Governing Council initiated processes in preparation towards the first election of officers and representatives for the Association, which took place in 2015.

Founding Governing Council of AfLIA (2013–2015)
Position	Name
President	Dr. Helena Asamoah-Hassan
Secretary	Valentina Bannerman
Regional Representatives
Central Africa	Alim Garga
Eastern Africa	Jacinta Were
Northern Africa	Shawky Salem
Southern Africa	Dr. John Tsebe
Western Africa	Marietou Diop

During the 3rd African Library Summit and 1st AfLIA Conference organized in July 2015 in Accra, Ghana, AfLIA held its first general meeting of members. At the 2015 General Meeting, the constitution of the Association was amended to have a vice president and executive director. This was approved and the first elected Governing Council, which included, chairpersons of various sections was inaugurated. Even though the Association was established in July 2013, it was registered as an international non-governmental organisation (NGO) under the laws of Ghana in October 2014 with its operational seat in Accra, Ghana.

== Membership ==
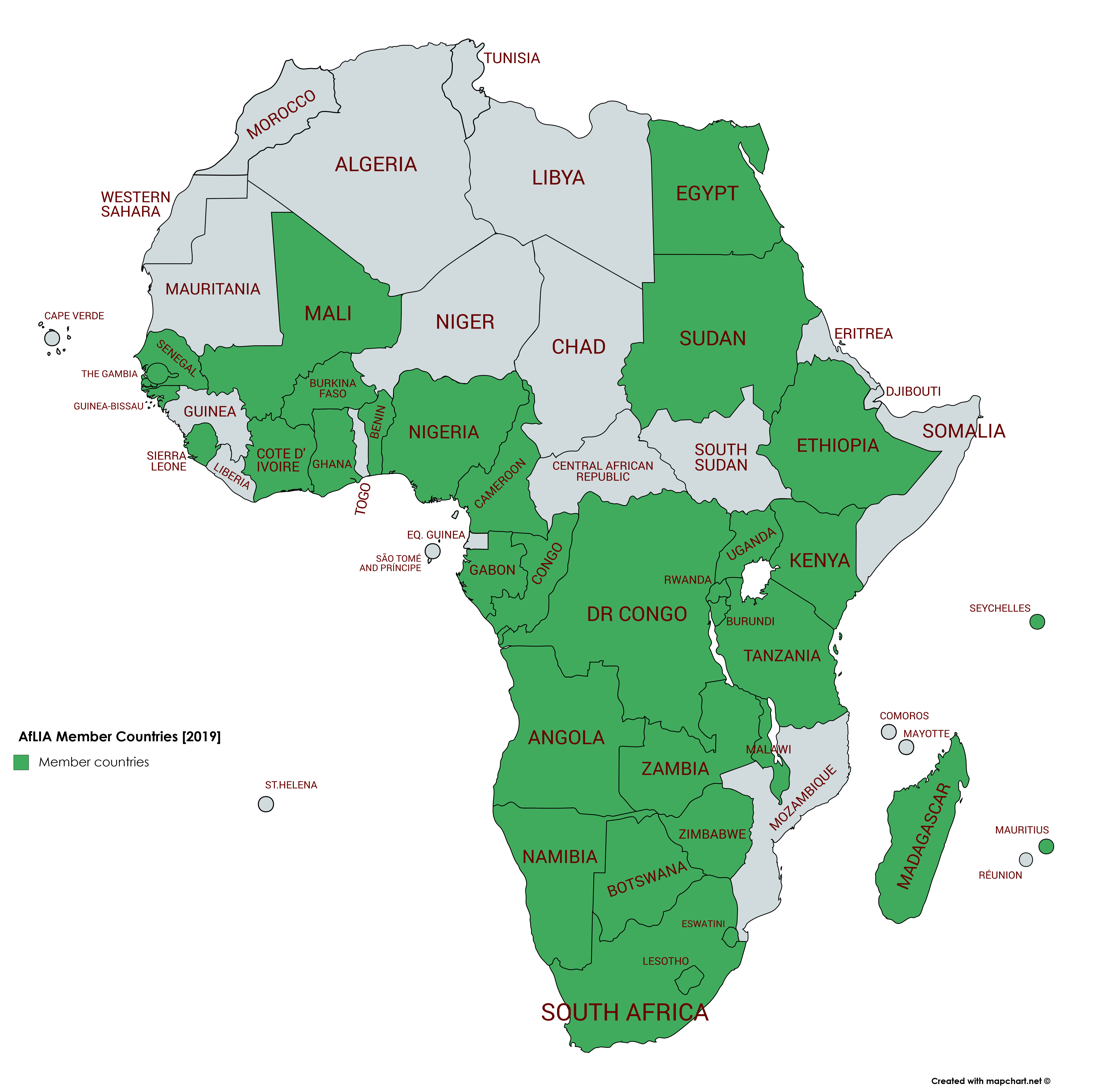
Non-member countries Member countries

AfLIA is an Association largely characterized by institutional membership. Membership is open to any organization, in Africa and the diaspora, with interest in the African library and information sector. Presently, members include; National Library Associations, National Libraries, Academic Libraries, Public Libraries, Community Libraries, Special Libraries, School Libraries, National Library Consortia, Information and Documentation Centres, Library and Information Education/Training Institutions, Library and Information-related Businesses, Friends of AfLIA/Libraries, Libraries and library Institutions in the Diaspora as well as Institutions/Organisations related to libraries and information services.

Presently, the Association has 141 member institutions and associations spanning across all the five regions of Africa and covering 32 out of the 54 African countries. There is also evidence of diaspora and international member institutions however, that category of members constitutes less than 2% of total membership.

On the other hand, AfLIA is also a member of the International Federation of Library Associations and Institutions (IFLA), another international body representing the interests of people who rely on libraries and information professionals.

== Governance ==
AfLIA is managed under the general guidelines of the Constitution and the Bye-Laws. The Association is governed and managed by an elected Governing Council, consisting of a President, Vice-President, Treasurer, Immediate Past-President, regional representatives and chairpersons of existing Sections, and a Secretariat headed by an Executive Director. The Annual General Meeting is the highest governance and decision making level of the Association. Members of the Governing Council have a tenure of two years and the outdooring new Governing Council often coincides with the biennial AfLIA Conference and African Library Summits.

The current president of the African Library and Information Associations and Institutions is Sarah Negumbo (2025–2027). She took over from Prof. Rosemary Shafack who was elected into the position after Alim Garga. Mr. Garga took over from Mr. Mandla Ntombela as President of AfLIA in July 2021. Dr. John Tsebe served as the first elected President of the Association from 2015 to 2019 and served as a member of the Governing Council as the immediate Past President of the Association from 2019 to 2021. Since July 2015, Dr. Helena Asamoah-Hassan has been the Executive Director of AfLIA.

Governing Council of AfLIA: 2019–2021
Position	Name	Country
President	Mr. Mandla Ntombela	South Africa
Vice President	Mr. Alim Garga	Cameroon
Executive Director	Dr. Helena Asamoah-Hassan	Ghana
Immediate Past President	Dr. John Tsebe	South Africa
Central Africa Representative	Prof. Rosemary Shafack	Cameroon
East Africa Representative	Dr. Sarah Kaddu	Uganda
North Africa Representative	Ms. Rania Shaarawy	Egypt
Southern Africa Representative	Ms. Elizabeth Matheus	Namibia
West Africa Representative	Dr. Chinwe Anunobi	Nigeria
French speaking West Africa	Mr. Mandiaye Ndiaye	Senegal
Portuguese speaking Africa	Mr. Iaguba Djalo	Guinea Bissau
Chair, National Libraries Section	Ms. Sarah Negumbo	Namibia
Chair, Academic Libraries Section	Ms. Nyarai Chibanda	Zimbabwe
Chair, Public and Community Libraries Section	Ms. Neemat Abdulrahim	Nigeria
Chair, Library Consortia	Ms. Cecile Coulibaly	Côte d'Ivoire
Chair, National Library Associations Section	Ms. Comfort Asare	Ghana
Chair, Library Education & Training	Dr. Ayodele Alonge	Nigeria
Chair, Parliamentary Libraries Section	Ms. Chama Mfula	Zambia
Chair, IFLA Africa Section (co-opted)	Ms. Nthabiseng Kotsokoane	South Africa
Africans in Diaspora	Prof. Ismail Abdullahi	United States of America
Secretary to the Council	Ms. Doreen Appiah	Ghana

List of presidents of AfLIA
Name	Tenure
Dr. John Tsebe	2015–2019
Mr. Mandla Ntombela	2019–2021
Mr. Alim Garga	2021–2023
Prof. Rosemary Shafak	2023–2025
Ms. Sarah Negumbo	2025 –

== Library type sections ==
Currently there are seven sections in AfLIA. Executives of the Sections are elected by the sectional members every two years. Chairpersons of Sections become automatic members of the Governing Council.

== Strategic programmes and activities ==
The official purpose, according to the organization is “to empower the library and information community to actively promote the African development agenda through dynamic services that transform livelihoods". The organization's programs and activities are administered by the Secretariat in collaboration with various (internal) sections and committees as well as strategic partners.

=== Conferences and Roundtable Meetings ===
==== AfLIA Conferences and African Library Summits ====
AfLIA holds this library conference every two years. The conferences are usually dubbed; the n^{th} AfLIA Conference and the n^{th} African Library Summit and often held between May – July in member countries in an alternating fashion. The most recent conference was the 3rd AfLIA Conference and 5th African Library Summit, was held from 21 to 24 May 2019 in Nairobi, Kenya. It is expected that the next conference, 4th AfLIA Conference and 6th African Library Summit, will be held in 2019 in Accra, Ghana, according to the organization. The conference typically involves activities such as pre-conference workshops and seminars, paper, poster and ignite talk presentations, exhibitions, awards and honours sessions, cultural nights and other breakout sessions for Sections of the Association to meet. The Deputy President of Kenya, Mr. William Samoei Ruto, was the special guest of honour at the Cultural Night of the 2019 conference. The Association also holds its General Meeting and Governing Council Meetings during these conferences. AfLIA's conferences are notable for being one of the largest professional conferences organized on the continent, typically drawing library and information professionals, including exhibitors mainly from Africa, and other parts of the world.

==== African Public Library Summits ====
African Public Library Summits is continent-wide convening of public library leaders and policymakers in Africa. Unlike the AfLIA Conference and African Library Summits which targets all categories of LIS professionals, the African Public Library Summits are organized with focus on librarians and managers from the public library space across Africa. The conferences were held with funding from the Bill and Melinda Gates Foundation through the Global Libraries Initiative, to serve as a platform to discuss the opportunities for creating successful, 21st century libraries that contribute to the development priorities of African communities, countries and continent.

The first African Public Library Summit took place in Johannesburg in 2012, hosted by the University of South Africa Evidence show that the maiden Summit was not organized under the auspices of AfLIA, as the Association had not been established as at then but the second and third African Public Library Summits which took place in Ezulwini, Eswatini (formerly Swaziland), in 2016 and Durban, South Africa, in 2018 respectively, were organized by AfLIA. Since the Global Libraries Initiative came to a close at the end of 2018, it is unknown when and where the next African Public Library Summit will be held.

==== Roundtable Conference for African Ministers responsible for Libraries ====
In 2015, the Association initiated an advocacy platform meant to emphasize the role of libraries in knowledge acquisition and educational development and examine the progress made by Africa governments towards the library sector. The conference is also meant to provided leadership and guidance on how African governments can integrate libraries into their national development plans and also safeguard the allocation of resources towards the achievement of their goals.

The roundtable conference for African Ministers responsible for libraries (simply referred to as the Library Ministers' Meeting) targets and occasions the presence of African Ministers and or Ministries under whose jurisdiction the delivery of library and information services fall, as well as Directors of National Libraries or National Librarians. The conferences are often organized as a collaborative effort between the government ministry in charge of libraries, via the National Library or authorizing library body of the host country, and the African Library and Information Associations and Institutions (AfLIA).

So far, three Library Ministers' Meetings have been organized, that is 2017 and 2018. The most recent Library Ministers Meeting took place in October 2019 in Accra, Ghana and conference was represented by Ministers, Deputy Ministers, representatives or delegates and National Library Directors from 25 African countries.

One major milestone of the Library Minister's Meetings is that, host Ministers, who are by default chairpersons to the panel of ministers, release a document authorized by participating Ministers after their deliberations, which occur in-camera. These communiques serve as documented indication of the continuous commitment of participating African Ministers towards the development of the library sector in their respective countries. The Library Ministers' Meeting in 2015 birthed the Cape Town Declaration. The Library Ministers' Meeting in 2018 birthed the Durban Communique. The Library Ministers' Meeting in 2019 birthed the Accra Declaration.

=== Leadership and Continuous Professional Development Programmes ===
Leadership is an integral part of the success of every organization. AfLIA executes three major leadership and continuous professional development programs namely INELI-SSAf, AfLAc and IYALI.

==== International Network of Emerging Library Innovators (INELI) - SSAf ====
INELI is a blended learning program initially funded by the Bill and Melinda Gates Foundation through the Global Libraries Initiative. The program was established to facilitate the transformation of public libraries into engines of development by supporting upcoming public librarians to develop innovative services for the benefit of their communities. AfLIA manages the implementation of the INELI program for Sub-Saharan Africa. The programme emphasizes fostering strong networks of emerging library leaders in Africa who have developed their knowledge, attitude and skills for leadership through a variety of learning environments and networking. The program provides e-learning courses via a Moodle platform to participants.

In addition, participants convene for training workshops during AfLIA pre-conferences and are expected to successfully carry out community-based projects before graduating. Two cohorts have been trained so far. The first cohort is reported to have been enrolled in 2016 and passed out of the program in 2018. The first cohort constituted 32 participants from 14 African countries. According to AfLIA, the second cohort is made up 34 participants from 10 African countries.

==== AfLIA Leadership Academy – AfLAc ====
This programme provides in-service training to build capacity of mid-level managers of libraries to effectively manage libraries in this dynamic era of technology and information. The AfLAc programme was developed in partnership with the Public Library Association (PLA), USA, and modelled on the PLA Leadership Academy. Training is provided through a blending learning approach, and is intended to bridge the gap between management of collections and link them, on one hand, to communities and, on the other hand, make libraries vibrant centres of communities, combining people, information and services. The academy enables library leaders to discover how they can contribute towards building their communities, form partnerships with non-library organisations, and develop comprehensive services that impact everyday lives of library users and communities.

Aside online training, participants of the programme periodically convene for training workshops during the Association's pre-conferences and are expected to embark community-based projects, based on an identified local problem. Towards the end of the program, participants embark on a professional exchange program to the United States of America (Chicago in 2019 and Nashville in 2020).

AfLAc cohorts join the PLA Leadership Academy cohorts for final training sessions, embark on library visits and participate in some sessions of the PLA conferences. Graduation ceremonies for participants of AfLIA Leadership Academy often take place during the exchange programme. Two cohorts have been trained so far and a call for the third cohort is underway, according to the organization. Prior to 2020, the AfLAc programme was targeted at public and community librarians, however, the program has been recently been revised to target African librarians from all library types.

==== Initiative for Young African Library Innovators – IYALI ====
IYALI is a joint capacity building programme managed by the Electronic Information for Libraries (EIFL) in collaboration with AfLIA, the International Federation of Library Associations (IFLA), Aarhus Public Libraries, and the American Public LIbrary Association, (a branch of the American Library Association). IYALI states that their ultimate goal iso empower young African public librarians through realizing their leadership potential to adopt and promote innovative library services that contribute to sustainable development.

IYALI is a response to the growing importance of the internet in information access and to the disparity of internet acess in developing countires. They seek to arm young librarians with the skills and resources to implement technology-based services and outreach programs to help develop their libraries and meet the public’s information needs. IYALI also facilitates international networking for their librarians and encourages them to further innovate and use their ideas to push their libraries forward.

=== Short courses ===
Early Literacy Development course

The course which was developed in partnership with Neil Butcher & Associates is a 5 weeks online training which teaches the staff of African public and community libraries how to drive early literacy skills development through exposing children in their communities to libraries as literacy-rich environments and story hours as windows of opportunities for gaining print and phonemic awareness in English language and their mother tongues. Importantly, the course introduces the concept and practice of open licensing as a means of increasing age-appropriate reading resources in mother tongues through the translation of openly licensed storybooks. This course runs for 5 weeks, is free and is facilitated by AfLIA.

Openness course

This course's main objective is to provide a grounded understanding of the openness spectrum in research and scholarship to African academic and research libraries staff. Participants in the course are also taught how to advocate for openness in their respective institutions in pertinent areas e.g., how to promote awareness about Open access, open data, open licensing, OERs as well as lead advocacy for institutional policies and possible adoption in these areas. The course which runs for 5 weeks is free, facilitated by AfLIA and was developed in partnership with OER Africa of Saide.

== Partners ==
AfLIA is in partnership with several organisations some of which are listed below.

- African Union
- Bibliotheca Alexandrina of The Arab Republic of Egypt
- Chartered Institute of Library and Information Professionals (CILIP)
- European Bureau of Library, Information and Documentation Associations (EBLIDA)
- International Federation of Library Associations and Institutions (IFLA)
- Saide and OER Africa
- Public Library Association (PLA) of the American Library Association
- The Technology & Social Change Group (TASCHA), University of Washington
- Wikipedia Library
- Wikimedia Foundation
- World Intellectual Property Organization (WIPO)
- Scholarly Publishing and Academic Resources Coalition – SPARC Africa
- Neil Butcher and Associates (NBA)
- William and Flora Hewlett Foundation
- DataCite

== Publications ==
- AfLIA Statements Declarations and Communiques – includes Statements about International Literacy for Development; Freedom of Information; Freedom of Access to Information and Freedom of Expression, Cape Town Declaration, Durban Communique and Accra Declaration, EIFL, AfLIA & IFLA Joint Call for Malawi to embrace spirit of Marrakesh Treaty .
- AfLIA Professional Reports – includes publication such as How African Libraries Contribute to the African Union Agenda 2063.

== See more ==
- List of library associations
