= N. Temple Hamlyn =

British Anglican bishop (1864–1929)

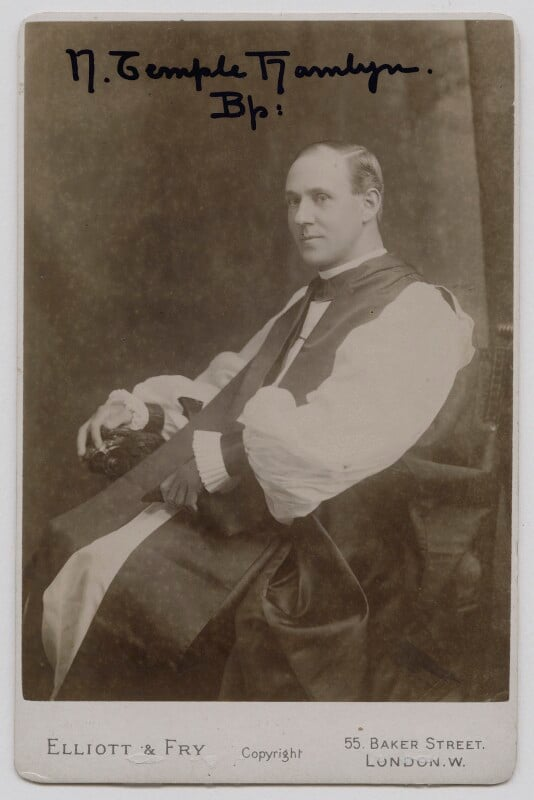
Hamlyn c. 1900s

Nathaniel Temple Hamlyn (1864–1929) was an Anglican bishop in Africa in the first decade of the 20th century.

Hamlyn was educated at Totnes Grammar School and Durham University, completing his Licentiate of Theology in 1899, followed by a MA in 1902, and a doctorate in Divinity in 1904. He was ordained in 1891 and began his career with a curacy in Eglingham. His career took him to Africa as a CMS Missionary where he rose to become Archdeacon of Lagos and then an Assistant Bishop before becoming Bishop of Accra in 1909. He was a founding father of Adisadel College in Cape Coast, Ghana. Returning to England he held incumbencies in Eaton and Great Yarmouth.

Outside his clerical duties Hamlyn maintained an interest in Archaeology and produced various drawings for archaeological societies.

Church of England titles
New office	Bishop of Accra; 1908–1910	Succeeded by Mowbray O'Rorke
