= SAIDE =

Nonprofit organization in South Africa

Saide (formerly South African Institute for Distance Education)
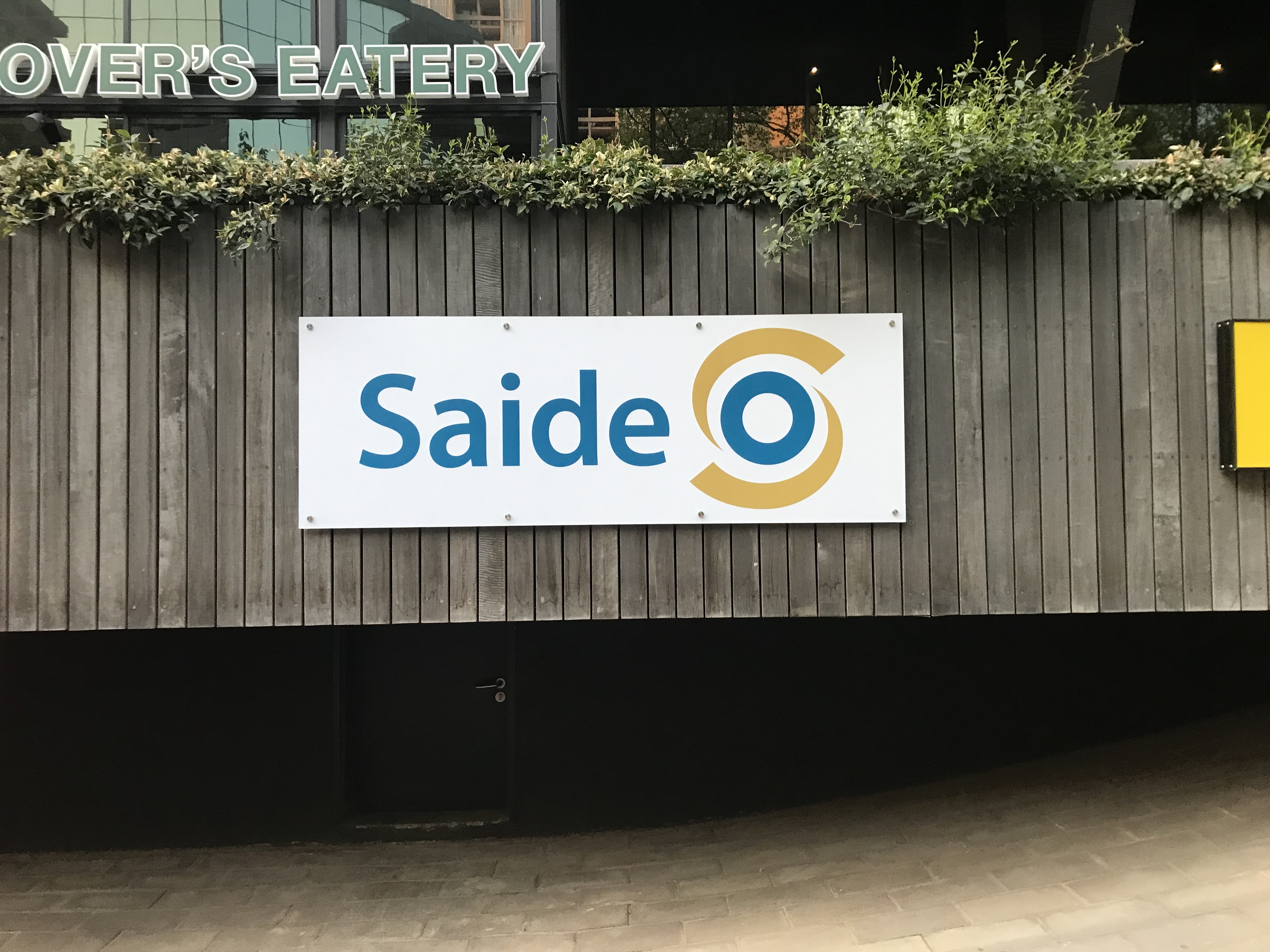
- Saide sign board outside their Braamfontein offices
- Formation: 1992
- Founder: Saide Board of Trustees Founding Director: Jenny Glennie
- Type: SAIDE is a non-profit organization that is registered as an educational trust
- Purpose: SAIDE is committed to improving education using open learning.
- Headquarters: Braamfontein, Johannesburg
- Region served: Sub-Saharan Africa
- Chief Executive Officer: Innocent Nkata
- Website: Official website

Saide (formerly the South African Institute for Distance Education) transforms education policy and practices with open learning. This is a non-profit, non-governmental, public benefit organization, which seeks to contribute new or appropriate models of open and distance practice and enable equitable and meaningful access to knowledge and skills in Sub Saharan Africa.

Saide builds networks or brings educational communities together, develops their capabilities and increases equitable and meaningful access to knowledge, skills and learning. Saide seek to widen access to education, but they do not see themselves as an implementation agency. Instead, they are advocates for the development and implementation of open and alternative models and modes for teaching and learning at post-school level. Their services include learning design, the development and sharing of open educational resources and educational transformation. especially at scale.

Since the organization's inception in 1992, Saide has taken an educational leadership role and managed a diverse range of collaborative educational projects, intended to improve the quality of education in the region. Whether synchronous or asynchronous, SAIDE promotes the use of inclusive pedagogies and technologies which promote social justice.

Saide is based in Braamfontein Johannesburg. The organisation is found operating throughout South Africa and sub-Saharan Africa. It is a member of National Association of Social Change Entities in Education (NASCEE).

== History ==
UNISA, as a distance education institution, played a significant part under apartheid in offering school leavers and mature students an alternate route to formal recognition. Throughput was low and when The African National Congress (ANC) came to power, it committed to supporting distance education that was based on the principles of open learning. The newly formed government, commissioned Saide to investigate how distance might contribute integrally to the countries new education and training system.

Since then, Saide has taken on the responsibility for advocating for openness and acted catalyst for change and "create meaningful educational opportunities for poor and marginalised groups".

== Funding ==
Saide receives funding from the Hewlett_Foundation for "Supporting Effective Development And Use Of OER In Higher Education Systems In Africa", and the Kresge Foundation Siyaphumelela.

== Initiatives ==
Saide runs three major initiatives: OER Africa, Siyaphumelela (We Succeed) and African Storybook.
