= Lawrence Henry Yaw Ofosu-Appiah =

Ghanaian academician (1920 –1990)

Lawrence Henry Yaw Ofosu - Appiah
- Born: 18 March 1920
- Died: 1 June 1990 (aged 70)
- Citizenship: Ghana
- Occupations: Lecturer and author
- Years active: 1939–90
- Employer: Government of Ghana
- Organization: University of Ghana
- Parents: Seth Fianko; Agness Fianko (née Reynolds)

Lawrence Henry Yaw Ofosu-Appiah (18 March 1920 – 1 June 1990) was a Ghanaian academic who taught classics at the University of Ghana and was subsequently Director of the Encyclopedia Africana.

== Background ==
Ofosu-Appiah was born in a village called Kukua near Adawso in the Eastern Region of Ghana. His parents were Seth Fianko — a teacher and a descendant of the royal family of Kubease, Larteh, Ghana — and Agnes Fianko (née Reynolds) — also a teacher and a descendant of the royal family of Akropong, Akwapim, Ghana. His education started at Adawso Presbyterian Primary School. In January 1932, he joined Achimota Secondary School for his secondary education. In 1939, he began his career as a Latin and Twi teacher at Achimota School. In January 1942, he joined the Junior Staff Department. He was appointed to work as an Assistant Librarian. He went on to work as an Assistant Museum Curator.

In March 1944, the Achimota Council awarded him a scholarship to Oxford University, United Kingdom, and he was accepted at Hertford College. He was the first black African to come to Oxford to study Classics. He read Honour Moderations followed by Literae Humaniores.

He went to Jesus College, Cambridge, United Kingdom, in October 1948 to complete a diploma in Anthropology. Shortly after that, he was appointed Assistant Lecturer in Classics at the University College, Gold Coast, now University of Ghana.

== University College, Gold Coast, 1949–64 ==
Ofosu-Appiah was the first African to be appointed to the Classics Department of the University College, Gold Coast, now University of Ghana. He taught the first year Intermediate Arts class Latin. In April 1951, he took his Master of Arts Degree and ceased to be a Junior Member of Oxford University from that date.

In 1954, he had the honour of composing, in Latin, the inscription that was unveiled at the official opening of Akuafo Hall in 1955. In July 1954, he married Victoria Boohemaa Addo from Akropong, Akwapim. They had three daughters: Asantewa, Oseiwa and Asabea.

In April 1959, he was promoted to a Senior Lectureship in Classics. He was then appointed Senior Tutor in Akuafo Hall and presented his first students for graduation to the Duke of Edinburgh at the Great Hall of the University. He was chosen to represent the University of Ghana at the inauguration of the University Institute in Mogadishu in January 1960.

Ofosu-Appiah was elected a Fellow of the Ghana Academy of Learning in 1961. He was subsequently elected to the Standing Committee of the Ghana Academy of Sciences for 1963-64. In October 1961, he was appointed as a government representative to the West African Examination Council. In 1962, he was appointed to the Interim Council of the University of Cape Coast to represent the Arts Faculty. Also in 1962, he was elected master of Akuafo Hall, University of Ghana, Legon. He was the first African master of the hall and the installation was done by Professor Adu Boahen, the Senior Tutor at the time. Ofosu-Appiah was also elected Chairman of the Board for University Primary School, Legon, in 1964.

== United States of America, 1964–66 ==
Ofosu-Appiah was awarded a Fulbright Scholarship and the post of Visiting Professor of Classics at Dartmouth College, Hanover, New Hampshire, United States, for the academic year 1964-65. He was the first black person to join the faculty. He taught Latin and Greek and also helped the English Department by teaching English Literature.

He was offered the distinguished scholar’s chair for 1965-66: "The Edgar B. Stern University Professor", at Dillard University, New Orleans, Louisiana. He accepted the post and was assigned to the Division of Humanities, where he taught Philosophy and Literature.

== Encyclopaedia Africana Secretariat ==
Ofosu-Appiah accepted the position of Director of the Encyclopedia Africana Project in Accra in August 1966. This was a project inspired by W. E. B. Du Bois. He met with the then Director of the Encyclopædia Britannica, Sir William Hailley, who advised that the biographies would make sense only if they had a historical introduction and to have several volumes of country to country biographies.

The first volume of the Encyclopaedia Africana Dictionary of Biographies, Ethiopia-Ghana, was published in June 1977. This was followed by the second volume, Sierra Leone-Zaire, in December 1979.

== Public service for the Republic of Ghana ==
Ofosu-Appiah was appointed the Chairman of the Ghana Library Board in March 1967. In 1969, he opened the Bolgatanga Library. In 1970, when asked by the government of the Second Republic to continue as the Chairman, he created a new Ghana Library Board Act, which was implemented in June 1970.

He was appointed a member of the National Advisory Committee of the National Liberation Council from 1967 to 1968. He was also appointed a member of the Committee on Imprisoned Political Offenders. In September 1967, he was appointed a member of the Board of Directors of the Ghana Airways Corporation until April 1969.

After the inauguration of the Second Republic took place in 1969, he was offered the Chairmanship of the Ghana State Housing Corporation. He was also elected to the National Executive of the Progress Party in 1970 and subsequently appointed the Chairman of a Committee on the Winneba Training College. His terms of reference included suggestions for the improvement of higher education.

Ofosu-Appiah chaired a committee set up in 1967 to establish lectures in memory of J.B. Danquah. The lectures began in February 1968. Ofosu-Appiah delivered the anniversary lectures in 1969, as well as the eighth series of lectures in 1975 on the subject: "Joseph Ephraim Casely Hayford: The Man of Vision and Faith." This lecture was published in 1976.

In October 1968, he won a seat on the board of the Ghanaian Council for Scientific and Industrial Research (CSIR). He then went on to be elected the Honorary Secretary of the Ghana Academy of Sciences (GAS).

== Writing ==
In 1962, Ofosu-Appiah translated Homer's Odyssey into Twi, and it was used as a set book by the Ministry of Education of Ghana. He wrote People in Bondage, which was published in the United States by Lerner Publishing Group, and Slavery: A Brief Survey, which was published in Ghana by Waterville.

In 1969, he completed The Life and Times of J. B. Danquah, ensuring that the part Danquah played in Gold Coast politics would not be forgotten. This was eventually published in August 1974. 1970 saw the start of yet another book: The Life of Lt. General Emmanuel Kwasi Kotoka. This book was published in 1972. At the suggestion of James Moxon, Ofosu-Appiah wrote the book The Life of Dr. J. E. K. Aggrey. This was published by Waterville just in time for the 100th Anniversary Celebration of the birth of Aggrey in 1975.

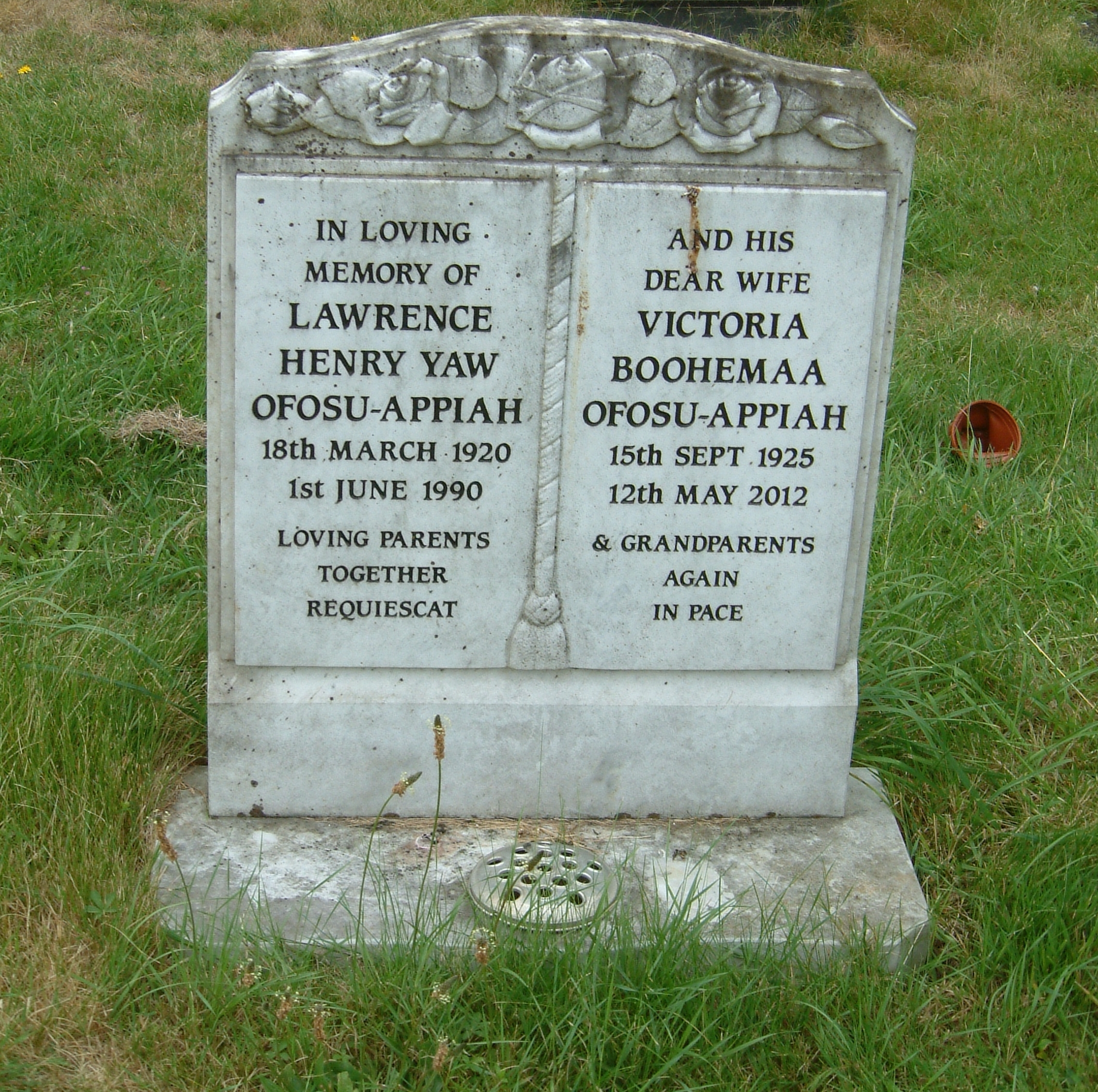
Headstone of Lawrence Henry Yaw Ofosu-Appiah and Victoria Boohemaa Ofusu-Appiah

In 1975, Ofosu-Appiah tried unsuccessfully to get a Twi Language and Literature Research Unit established. He did, however, succeed in acquiring funding for his Twi translation of Plato's Apology. He also translated Sophocles's Antigone for Waterville to publish. He was helped by Rev. E. K. Kwabbi, D. O. Kwapong, and E. T. Koramoa to achieve this goal.

== Death ==
Again in 1975, Ofosu-Appiah began writing an English-Twi dictionary with the help of Mr E. O. Koranteng, who was, at the time, on the staff of the University of Ghana Language Centre. Ofosu-Appiah attempted to publish this dictionary in 1985 but could not find any publishers interested at the time. He also wrote an article for the Conspectus of the World Encyclopaedia of Black Peoples of the World that was published by Scholarly Press in September 1975.

Ofosu-Appiah died on 1 June 1990, at the Luton & Dunstable Hospital, Bedfordshire, United Kingdom. He was buried at the Vale Cemetery, Butterfield Green, Luton, on 11 June 1990. His wife died on 12 May 2012 in Ghana and her ashes were brought to the Vale Cemetery for interment as she requested, being buried in his grave on 21 June 2012. He is survived by his two daughters Asantewa and Asabea.
