= John Aglionby (bishop) =

Aglionby in June 1936.

John Orfeur Aglionby MC (16 March 1884 – 15 May 1963) was Bishop of Accra during the second quarter of the 20th century.

Educated at Westminster and The Queen's College, Oxford, Aglionby was ordained in 1911 and began his career with a curacy at Holy Trinity, South Shields. In 1915, Aglionby joined the Royal Army Medical Corps as a Private [Church Times obituary, 24.5.1963] and, six months later, was interviewed by the Chaplain-General for a commission in the Army chaplaincy. He was noted as 'Tall, Quiet, fairly good' and, although he was strongly Anglo-Catholic in a chaplaincy preferring Evangelicals, he was appointed and posted to France. His Military Cross was gazetted on 4 June 1917. His brother, William, also an army chaplain, would be awarded a MC in January 1918. In 1917, John was appointed Vicar of Monkwearmouth and remained there until 1924 when he became Bishop of Accra. Aglionby was a strong supporter of establishing a library service in Ghana. He volunteered his own book collection in 1928 and later his own money to establish the first location it the 1930s but it was lost to the government. He later assisted in 1945 when the Aglionby Library was opened in Accra in November 1946 .

He retired to Orpington in 1951; he had become a Doctor of Divinity (DD).

== See also ==
- Abuabu Cross

Church of England titles
Preceded by Mowbray O'Rorke	Bishop of Accra; 1924–1951	Succeeded by John Daly
