= Anglican Diocese of Bo =

The Anglican Diocese of Bo (Sierra Leone) is a diocese of the Church of the Province of West Africa, a member church of the worldwide Anglican Communion. Its partner diocese is Chichester, England.

The current diocese, along with the Anglican Diocese of Freetown, was formed in 1981 by the partition of the previous Diocese of Sierra Leone, which had been established in 1852. The diocese of Sierra Leone, together with the dioceses of Niger, Accra, Lagos and the Diocese of the Gambia and the River Pongas, had been formed, with some local resistance, into the Province of West Africa in 1951.

As of 2023 the Bishop of Bo is the Right Reverend Solomon Scott-Manga, the fourth Bishop of the Diocese.

== Bishops of Sierra Leone ==
- 1852–1854 Owen Vidal (1st bishop, died at sea, 1854)
- 1855–1857 John Weeks
- 1857–1860 John Bowen (died in office of yellow fever)
- 1860–1869 Edward Beckles
- 1870-1882 Henry Cheetham
- 1883–1897 Graham Ingham
- 1897–1901 John Taylor Smith
- 1902–1909 Edmund Elwin
- 1910–1921 John Walmsley
- 1923–1936 George Wright (afterwards Bishop of North Africa, 1936)
- 1936–1961 James L.C. Horstead (also Archbishop of West Africa, 1955–1961)
- 1961–1981 Moses N.C.O. Scott (also Archbishop of West Africa, 1969–1981)

== Bishops of Bo ==
- Michael Keili, 1981 - 1994
- Samuel Gbonda, 1994 - 2008
- Emmanuel Tucker, 2008 - 2019
- Solomon Scott-Manga, 2020 -
