= St Paul's Church, Quarndon =

St Paul’s Church, Quarndon
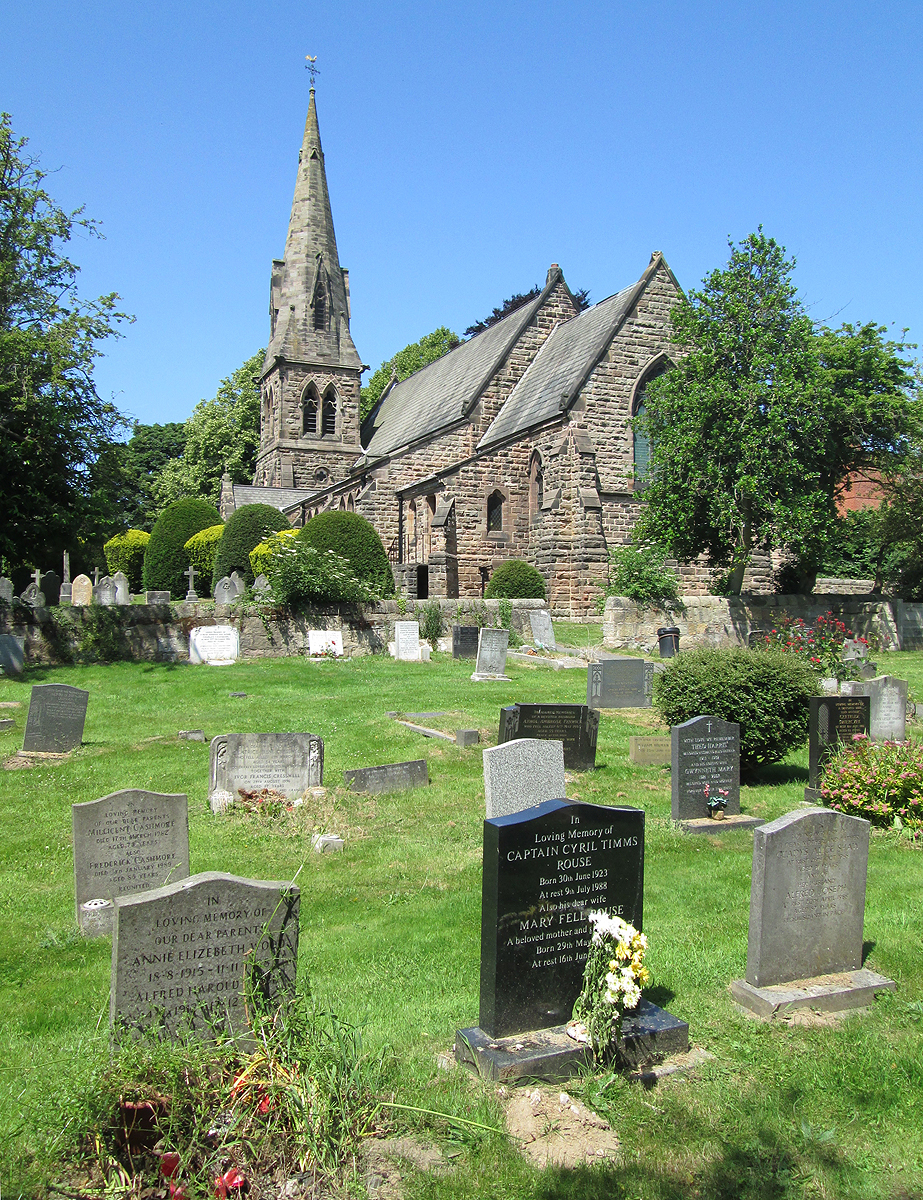
- St Paul’s Church, Quarndon
- St Paul’s Church, Quarndon
- 52°57′54.19″N 1°30′8.6″W
- OS grid reference: SK 33494 41022
- Location: Quarndon, Derbyshire
- Country: England
- Denomination: Church of England

History
- Dedication: St Paul
- Consecrated: 16 April 1874

Architecture
- Heritage designation: Grade II listed
- Architect(s): Giles and Brookhouse
- Groundbreaking: 5 November 1872
- Completed: 16 April 1874
- Construction cost: £3,500 (equivalent to £342,200 in 2025)

Specifications
- Length: 81 feet (25 m)
- Width: 50 feet (15 m)
- Height: 80 feet (24 m)

Administration
- Province: Canterbury
- Diocese: Derby
- Archdeaconry: Derby
- Deanery: Duffield
- Parish: Quarndon

St Paul's Church, Quarndon is a Grade II listed parish church in the Church of England in Quarndon, Derbyshire.

== History ==
The old church was entirely replaced between 1872 and 1874 with a new church in the centre of the village to the designs of the architects Giles and Brookhouse of Derby. The old church was sold by Ault and Spreckley, auctioneers on 7 May 1874.

The foundation stone was laid on 5 November 1872 by Lady Scarsdale. The church cost £3,500 (equivalent to £342,200 in 2025), and was built by the contractor Edwin Thompson of Derby from Duffield stone. It was 80 feet (24 m) high to the vane, 50 feet (15 m) wide and 81 feet (25 m) long. The pulpit and lectern were given in memory of the wife of Bishop Henry Cheetham, and the font was the gift of the architects.

The new church and churchyard were consecrated on 16 April 1874 by the Bishop of Lichfield, Rt. Revd. George Selwyn.

The stained glass window at the east was added in 1890. The clock was installed in 1897 to mark the Queen's Diamond Jubilee at a cost of £80. It was set going in the last week of November 1897.

== Organ ==
A pipe organ was built by John Mitchell Grunwell of Becket Mill, Derby, in 1874. A specification of the organ can be found on the National Pipe Organ Register.

== See also ==
- Listed buildings in Quarndon
