= Quarndon =

Village in Derbyshire, England

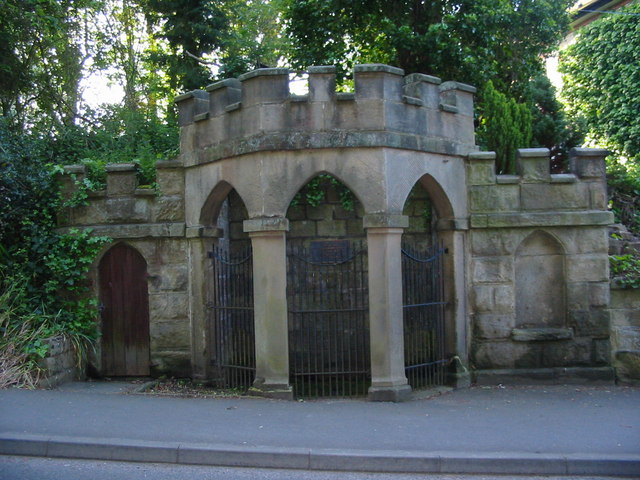
- Spring Well at the Chalybeate Wellhouse, Quarndon

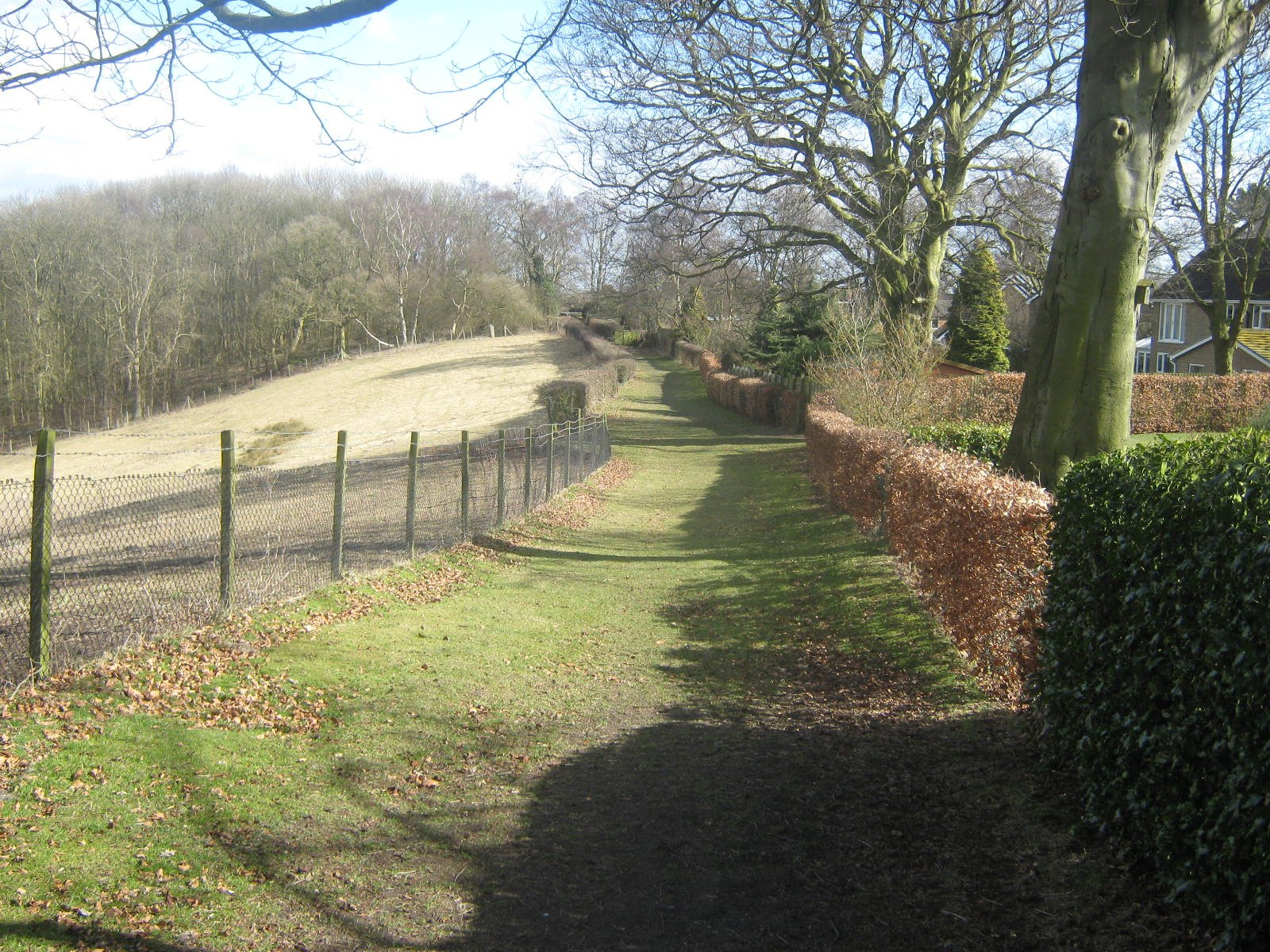
- Public footpaths and mixed pasture and wooded hills such as that pictured above in Quarndon reflect the parish's main 'green space' land use category.

- Location within Derbyshire
- Area: 4.49 km^{2} (1.73 sq mi)
- Population: 933 (2011 census)
  - Density: 208/km^{2} (540/sq mi)
- OS grid reference: SK334410
- District: Amber Valley
- Shire county: Derbyshire
- Region: East Midlands
- Country: England
- Sovereign state: United Kingdom
- Post town: DERBY
- Postcode district: DE22
- Dialling code: 01332
- Police: Derbyshire
- Fire: Derbyshire
- Ambulance: East Midlands
- UK Parliament: Mid Derbyshire

Quarndon /ˈkwɔːrn.dən/ is a linear village in the south of the Amber Valley district of Derbyshire, England. It is spread along four minor upland roads, approximately 1 mile north of the Derby suburb of Allestree, two of which lead towards the city.

Many tourists throughout the 18th and early 19th centuries visited Quarndon's chalybeate springs within and next to its wellhouse. Many of these also sampled the waters of a geologically related spring in the grounds of its western neighbour, Kedleston Park and Hall, Kedleston – a village with a smaller population due to its few roads and single land-dominating estate which was once its manor. The lords of that manor equally held lands here and were significant patrons of the church, the early 19th century free school founded here and funded the construction of the village hall.

== Amenities ==
=== Education ===
The Curzon CE (Aided) Primary School is in Quarndon which is mostly funded by the local authority, as is Quarndon Pre-School which receives a proportion of funding from Derbyshire County Council and is in the remainder privately funded.

=== Community ===
Quarndon has a Church of England church built 1872–74, designed by Giles and Brookhouse in a stone mid-13th century style. St Paul's church has informal regular community involvement – it hosts clubs for children and their carers and wide-reaching coffee and cake, exploration of life meetings. The minister in Quarndon is Rev. Becky Mathew.

Quarndon village hall was built by the Curzon family (assisted with funds raised by village efforts) and opened on 9 May 1914. In 1965, the hall was extended with an enlarged stage. It was extended again in 2004.

=== Sports ===
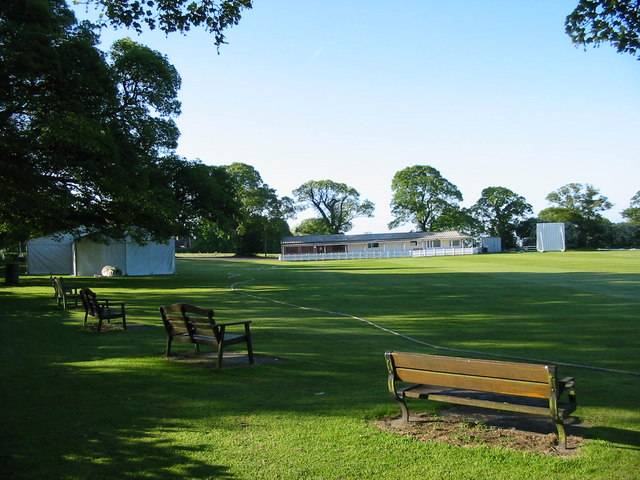
Quarndon Cricket Ground and Park

Quarndon's westernmost area is part of the 18-hole Kedleston Park Golf Club.

Quarndon Cricket Club has a ground with parkland, benches, pavilion and in the summer a marquee. Four adult men's sides compete, junior and women's sides also compete against other Derbyshire villages and urban communities.

=== Drama ===
Quarndon has an amateur dramatics society which has been performing plays in the village hall since 1941.

=== Heritage sites ===
Heritage Lottery funding fully funded a brief wide-ranging history of Quarndon to be researched, distributed and electronically published. The conservation areas and sulphurous well draw visitors and the history, including the architectural history of the church is available in the village as guidebooks.

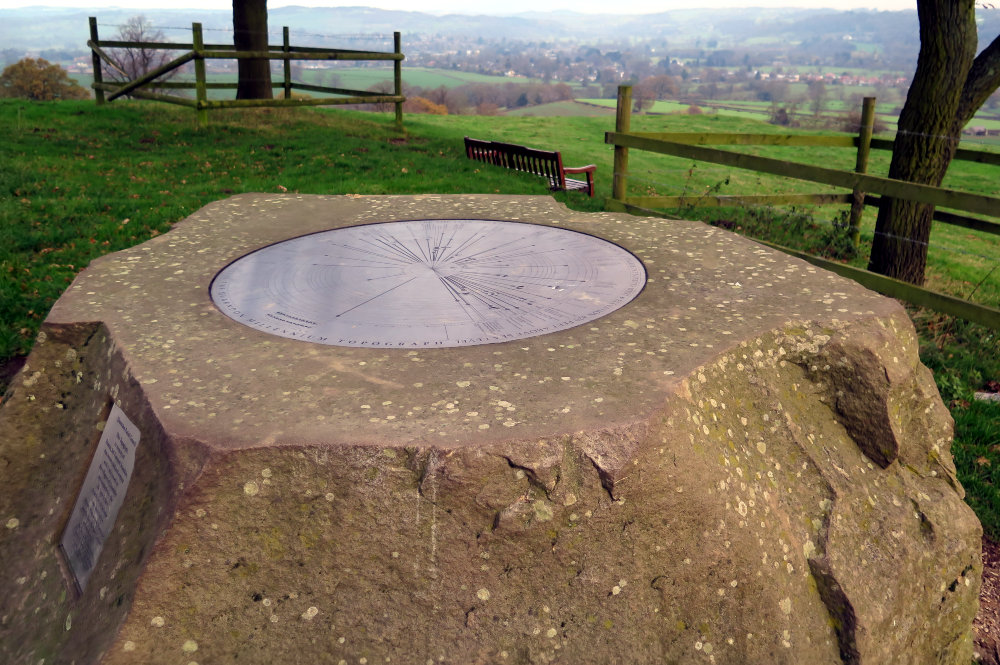
The Millennium Topograph

=== Millennium Topograph on Bunkers Hill ===
52°58′8″N 1°29′36″W This directional compass, provides details of bearings, distances, elevations and dates of nearly 50 places of special interest and was unveiled on 29 September 2001. It stands on an 8-ton block of Derbyshire gritstone – 140 metres above sea level – funded by the will of the third Viscount Scarsdale who died in 2000 aged 76.

== Geography ==
Quarndon has elevations ranging from 75 metres above sea level to 144 metres. The lowest point is at the end of a projection to the south, following Markeaton Brook, which rises at two sources, one in the village and the other from above the lake of Kedleston Park, a large landscape garden in the neighbouring parish to the west. The highest part, Quarndon Hill is a partly settled ridge of mixed woodland and common land topped by a gently winding street leading north-west. The vast majority of the village's buildings are residential, which spread along four minor upland roads north of the City of Derby's suburb of Allestree, two of which lead towards the city.

== History ==
A holding (manor) of Quarndon appears in the Domesday Book of 1086. This survey recorded 8 ploughlands having been held in 1066 by King Edward contemporaneously by William the Conqueror who was also tenant-in-chief.

An ivy-clad bell tower mark the remains of the Norman chapel which served the community's spiritual, marriages, funereal and administrative (vestry) needs until 1874. In the 1870s the village was created an ecclesiastical parish in 1732 converting the small and crumbling chapel to a church and had its forerunner replacement on the present site in 1790.

Starting with a digression to the neighbouring house and park reflective of his landed class, Daniel Defoe wrote in the early 18th century:

In our way we past an [ancient] seat [Kedleston Hall], large, but not very [ornate], of Sir Nathaniel Curson, a noted and (for wealth) over great family, for many ages inhabitants of this county. Hence we kept the Derwent on our right-hand, but kept our distance, the waters being out; for the Derwent is a frightful creature when the hills load her current with water; I say, we kept our distance, and contented our selves with hearing the roaring of its waters, till we came to Quarn or Quarden. a little ragged, but noted village, where there is a famous chalybeat spring, to which abundance of people go in the season to drink the water, as also a cold bath.

— Daniel Defoe, 1720s

A brief extract of a large Victorian geographical, historic and economic Topographical Dictionary reads:

It comprises 790 acres (3.2 km^{2})...619 grass-land, 160½ ploughland and gardens, and 10 acres plantations...The soil in the lower part is a very rich marl, and in the higher a light dry sandy soil...the surface is undulated, and the scenery picturesque. The village, which is scattered, is considerable, being nearly a mile and a half in length; it is of pleasant appearance, and contains some very neat modern houses...church is an ancient structure, with a campanile tower nearly covered with ivy, and a Norman arch at the entrance. Sir John Curzon, in 1725, bequeathed an annuity of £20 for the support of a free school. In the village is a chalybeate spring, which was much resorted to upwards of a century since, and is still visited in summer, the water being highly beneficial in cases of debility.

— Samuel Lewis, 1848

The church cost just over £4,000 (equivalent to £451,000 in 2023) to build. Its land together with a contribution of £1,000 was given by the Rev'd Alfred Curzon, 4th Baron Scarsdale. Its skeleton clock was installed in 1897 to mark Queen Victoria's Diamond Jubilee.

== Demography ==
2011 Published Statistics: Population, home ownership and extracts from Physical Environment, surveyed in 2005
Output area	Homes owned outright	Owned with a loan	Socially rented	Privately rented	Other	km^{2} green spaces	km^{2} roads	km^{2} water	km^{2} domestic gardens	km^{2} domestic buildings	km^{2} non-domestic buildings	Usual residents	km^{2}
Quarndon	386	415	23	99	10	4.06	0.06	0.01	0.38	0.05	0.01	933	4.49

== Notable people ==
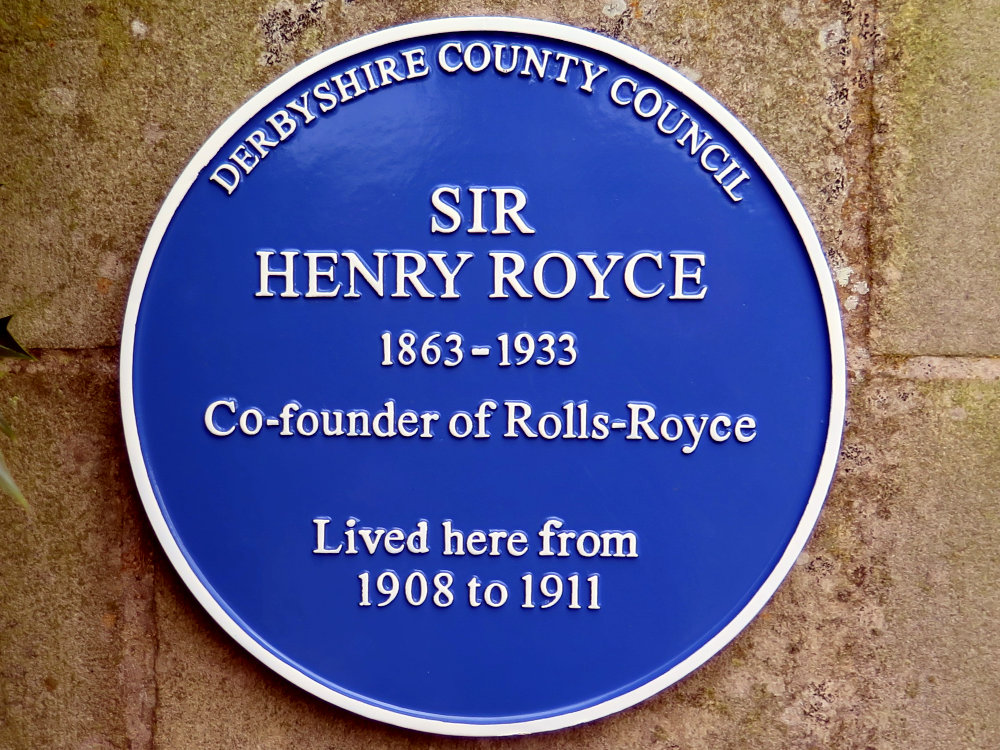
Royce's blue plaque, outside Quarndon House

- Henry Cheetham (1827–1899), local vicar and Anglican bishop of Sierra Leone from 1870 until 1882.
- Henry Smith Wright (1839–1910), barrister, banker, politician and MP for Nottingham South from 1885 to 1895.
- Henry Royce (1863–1933), engineer who designed car and aeroplane engines, a plaque was erected on the gate pillar of Quarndon House to commemorate Royce's residency in the village from 1908 to 1911, a time when Rolls-Royce's Nightingale Road factory had just opened.
- Bertie Banks who was T. E. Lawrence's driver during World War I
- Dave Brailsford (born 1964), former Performance Director - British Cycling, General Manager of Team Sky

=== Sport ===
- Arthur Walker Richardson (1907–1983), cricketer who played 159 first-class cricket matches for Derbyshire
- Brian Clough (1935–2004), as a football player, he played 213 games for Middlesbrough and was manager of Derby County from 1967 and 1973, and Nottingham Forest from 1975 to 1993
- Mike Smith (1935–2013), footballer who played 134 games for Bradford City
- Mike Ingham (born 1950), football commentator and broadcaster, grew up locally

== See also ==
- Listed buildings in Quarndon
