= Anglican Diocese of Sierra Leone =

The Anglican Diocese of Sierra Leone was founded in 1852. In 1981 it was divided into the new dioceses of Freetown and Bo.

== Bishops of Sierra Leone ==
Map of Sierra Leone (1859) featuring the parishes of the Anglican Diocese

- 1852–1854 Owen Vidal (1st bishop, died at sea, 1854)
- 1855–1857 John Weeks (died in office of "African Sickness")
- 1857–1860 John Bowen (died in office of Yellow Fever)
- 1860–1869 Edward Beckles
- 1870-1882 Henry Cheetham
- 1883–1897 Graham Ingham
- 1897–1901 John Taylor Smith
- 1902–1909 Edmund Elwin
- 1910–1922 John Walmsley
- 1923–1936 George Wright (afterwards Bishop of North Africa, 1936)
- 1936–1961 James L.C. Horstead (also Archbishop of West Africa, 1955–1961)
  - 11 June 1948: – after 1957 Percy Jones, assistant bishop
- 1961–1981 Moses N.C.O. Scott (also Archbishop of West Africa, 1969–1981)

== Curates of Freetown ==
- 1855-1858 Revd Francis Pocock was Chaplain to John Weeks. He returned to England where he founded Monkton Combe School in 1868. Amongst the school's earliest pupils were young men from Freetown.
