= Emmanuel Tucker =

Emmanual Tucker has been Bishop of Bo since 2008.

Church of England titles
Preceded by Samuel Gbonda	Bishop of Bo; 2008–	Succeeded by Incumbent
