= Elizabeth Frazer Skelton =

Euro-African slave trader

Elizabeth Frazer Skelton also called "Mammy Skelton" (1800–1855) was a Euro-African slave trader.

== Life ==
She was the daughter of the slave trader John Frazer of Scotland (1769-1813) and the African woman Phenda. She had one brother, James, and three sisters, Margaret, Mary Ann and Eleanor.

Her father had emigrated to Liberia in 1797, but was banished because he engaged in slavery. Her mother Phenda was the widow of a British slave trader, and managed a slave trade business in African Bangalan, while Elizabeth's father managed the ship exporting the enslaved people to Charleston in South Carolina and (after 1807) to Spanish East Florida, where he also owned plantations managed by slave labor.

After the death of her father, his widow and children inherited the slave trade business in Africa - however, his property in Britain and in the US, such as the plantations in Florida, was claimed by his family in Britain, and the legal process dragged out until 1851. Elizabeth and her two younger sisters were educated at the mission girls' school of Elizabeth Renner, the Bashia School, until 1816, when they were sent to Liverpool to finish their education before they return to Africa.

Elizabeth married the Anglo-African William Skelton Jr. of Kissing, who founded the famous trading house of Skelton. She and her spouse founded the slave fort Victoria at the river Rio Nunez in 1825/26, which they managed together. Their trading post Victoria functioned as the conduit for slaves transported by canoe or overland to Portuguese Bissau. They were the business associates of Elizabeth's sister and brother-in-law, Mary Ann Frazer and the Afro-American slave trader Thomas Gaffery Curtis of Fallangia.

In 1843, the American trader Enoch R. Ware described her:

"[She] looks very well and much younger than when I left here in 1841. She received the information of their acquisitions with much dignity- more so than most white women. It is her inheritance from her father who married in the Rio Pongas, & this one & one sister and the only remaining children. The father was white and the property is the proceeds of an estate in Florida. Mrs. Skelton has never been in the United States & she telles me that it never was her wish to go there - probably on account of the prejudice against coloured people and low state they occupy in society there. She has passed four years in England where coloured persons are received almost or quite on an equality with whites."

Enoch R. Ware also describe how Skeltons daughters Emma and Mary Ann were given the same education of accomplishments as was customary for Western ladies.

When she was widowed, she managed the business of her late spouse herself. At that time, the slave trade was banned by the British and United States, but continued in practice. She had a powerful position as a dominant figure in the regional business community, and was for a time responsible for half of the export of the region. In about 1840, under the pressure of the British West Africa Squadron and the Blockade of Africa, the slave traders of the region gradually shifted to growing peanuts with slave labour, an industry in which she also became one of the leading figures. In 1851, Elizabeth, being the only one living of her siblings, finally received her inheritance after her father, worth over one million dollars.

She remarried the mixraced trader John Nelson Bicaise of Trinidad, and her daughter Mary Ann married in 1846 to Joseph Richmond Lightburn, who belonged to the family of Niara Bely.

== See also ==
- Signares, female slave traders in colonial West Africa
