= John Taylor Smith =

British Anglican bishop and military chaplain

The Right Reverend John Taylor-Smith KCB CVO QHC
- Chaplain-General to the Forces
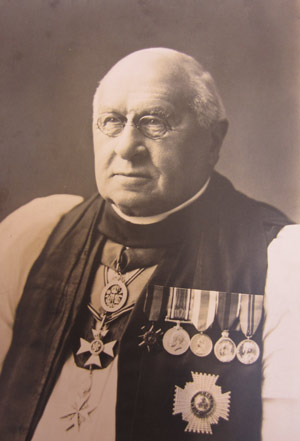
- Church: Church of England
- In office: 1901 to 1925
- Predecessor: Cox Edghill
- Successor: Alfred Jarvis
- Other posts: Sub-Prelate of the Venerable Order of Saint John (1916–1938); Bishop of Sierra Leone (1897–1901)

Orders
- Ordination: 1885 (deacon); 1886 (priest)
- Consecration: 1897

Personal details
- Born: 20 April 1860 Kendal, Westmorland, England
- Died: 28 March 1938 (aged 77)
- Denomination: Anglicanism

John Taylor-Smith KCB CVO QHC (20 April 1860 – 28 March 1938) was an Anglican bishop and military chaplain. He was the Anglican Bishop of Sierra Leone by the end of the 19th century and the Chaplain-General to the Forces from the year 1901 to 1925.

== Early life and education ==
John Taylor-Smith was born in 1860 in Kendal, Westmorland, England. He is the son of John Smith.

== Ordained ministry ==
Taylor-Smith was ordained in the Church of England as a deacon in 1885 and as a priest in 1886. From 1885 to 1890, he served his curacy at St Paul's Church, Penge in the Diocese of Rochester. He then moved to colonial Sierra Leone, and served as Sub-Dean of St. George's Cathedral, Freetown, and Diocesan Missioner from 1890 to 1897. In 1897, he was consecrated to the episcopate as Bishop of Sierra Leone. He was also an Honorary Chaplain to the Queen (QHC) from 1896 to 1901.

On 1 November 1901, John Taylor-Smith was appointed Chaplain-General to the Forces, and therefore head of the Army Chaplains' Department. His tenure included the First World War, and he oversaw the expansion of the Army Chaplains' Department from around 120 chaplains in 1914 to almost 3,500 in 1918. He retired in 1925.

Having been appointed a Sub-Prelate of the Venerable Order of Saint John in 1916, Taylor-Smith continued in that role in retirement. He died on 28 March 1938.

== Honours ==
Taylor-Smith was appointed as the Commander of the Royal Victorian Order (CVO) in the 1906 Birthday Honours, and a Companion of the Order of the Bath (CB) in the 1921 New Year Honours. He created a Knight Commander of the Order of the Bath (KCB) in the 1925 Birthday Honours. As a clergyman, traditionally he would not have received the 'accolade' and thus was not entitled to style himself 'Sir'. He was awarded an honorary Doctor of Divinity (DD) degree in 1897.

Anglican Communion titles
Preceded by Graham Ingham	Bishop of Sierra Leone; 1897–1901	Succeeded by Edmund Elwin
Preceded by Cox Edghill	Chaplain-General to the Forces; 1901–1925	Succeeded by Alfred Jarvis
