= Samuel Gbonda =

Anglican bishop

Samuel Gbonda was Bishop of Bo from 1994 until 2008.

Church of England titles
Preceded by Michael Keili	Bishop of Bo; 1994–2008	Succeeded by Emmanuel Tucker
