= Elizabeth Renner =

Elizabeth Renner (died 1826) (maiden name Elizabeth Richards) was a Canadian-born missionary teacher who taught in Sierra Leone.

Renner was a Nova Scotia Settler. She emigrated from Nova Scotia to Freetown, Sierra Leone, in 1792.

In 1804, she became the housekeeper of the Melchior Renner of Württemberg, who was one of the first three missionaries sent to Africa and Freetown by the British Anglican Church Mission Society (CMS) that same year. In 1808, she married Melchior Renner.

She managed the missionary Bashia School for girls in 1808–1818. She was the first female teacher and principal of a girls' school in the missionary in Africa. Her school had many students from the elite Euro-African families of the region. One of her students were Elizabeth Frazer Skelton.
