= Michael Keili =

Michael Keili was the inaugural Bishop of Bo, serving from 1981 until 1994.

Church of England titles
Preceded by First incumbent	Bishop of Bo; 1981–1994	Succeeded by Samuel Gbonda
