= Julia Sass =

British missionary (died 1891)

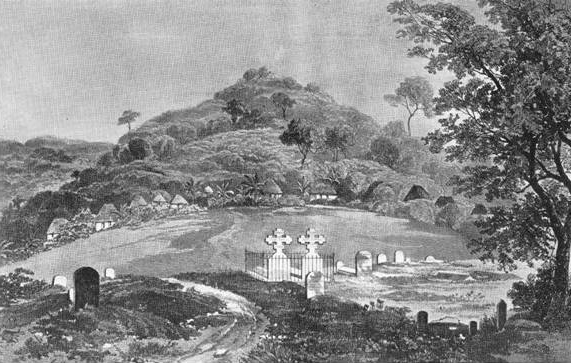
View of the New Burial Ground, Freetown by Julia Sass which appeared in The Memorials of John Bowen (1862)

Julia Emily Sass (died 20 October 1891), was a British missionary, active in Sierra Leone in the middle of the nineteenth century.

In 1849 she became the first principal of Annie Walsh Memorial School, where she has a school house named after her. She was responsible for the setting up of this school, but was absent from Sierra Leone from 1853 to 1855 for health reasons. Originally she was appointed superintendent of the Female Institution, Freetown under the auspices of the Church Missionary Society. She started off with three pupils, a number which doubled after a few months. The curriculum consisted of housework, bible training and schoolroom teaching. The school was set up to train the wives of missionaries and only accepted the daughters conceived in Christian wedlock. The school was consciously designed to replicate middle class attitudes in England.

She was interested in horticulture and corresponded with Joseph Dalton Hooker of the Royal Botanic Gardens, Kew.

== See also ==
- Sarah Hartwig (missionary)
