= Listed buildings in Quarndon =

Quarndon is a civil parish in the Amber Valley district of Derbyshire, England. The parish contains ten listed buildings that are recorded in the National Heritage List for England. Of these, one is listed at Grade II*, the middle of the three grades, and the others are at Grade II, the lowest grade. The parish contains the village of Quarndon and the surrounding countryside. The listed buildings consist of the remains of a former church, a current church and items in the churchyard, a hotel, an iron screen, a barn, houses, a well house and a milepost.

== Key ==
Grade	Criteria
II*	Particularly important buildings of more than special interest
II	Buildings of national importance and special interest

== Buildings ==
Name and location	Photograph	Date	Notes	Grade
Remains of Old Church; 52.95753°N 1.50625°W		Medieval	The remains of the church are in sandstone and are overgrown. They consist of part of the west wall and a little of each of the return walls. The west wall contains a shallow clasping buttress and part of a moulded string course, and to the south are the remains of a window jamb.	II
Kedleston Hotel; 52.96163°N 1.51582°W		1760–62	The hotel, designed by Robert Adam, is in red brick with floor and sill bands, a moulded stone eaves band, and a hipped slate roof. There is a U-shaped plan, with a central block of three storeys and five bays, and flanking single-storey three-bay wings. In the centre is a projecting feature consisting of Doric columns flanking a tripartite window, and an entablature with a partly balustraded parapet, over which is a window with a moulded surround and a triangular pediment on consoles. The other windows are sashes under gauged brick lintels. In each of the outer bays is a central round-arched window with impost blocks and a keystone, and the other bays contain sash windows.	II*
Iron screen 52.96749°N 1.52218°W		1767	The screen opposite the North Lodge at the entrance to Kedleston Park is in wrought iron, and was moved to its present position in 1916. It consists of a short length of plain spiked fencing, curving down at each end. Behind are openwork iron gate piers surmounted by lamp brackets, and between them are spiked iron gates.	II
Barn at Bath Farm; 52.96202°N 1.51506°W		Late 18th century	The barn is in red brick with a dentilled eaves cornice, and a tile roof with coped gables and plain kneelers. On the north front is a cart entrance with sliding doors and three tiers of rectangular vents.	II
Hall Cottages; 52.96193°N 1.50606°W	—	Late 18th century	A house and a cottage later combined into a house, it is in red brick with a dentilled eaves cornice and a tile roof. There are three storeys and six bays. On the front is a porch and a doorway with a rectangular fanlight, and to the left is a doorway with a segmental head. The windows in the lower two floors have segmental heads, and most of them are sashes, and in the top floor are casement windows with flat heads.	II
The Grange; 52.96390°N 1.50621°W	—	Late 18th century	The house, which was remodelled in the 19th century, is in red brick, mainly rendered, and has a roof of Welsh slate, partly hipped, and partly gabled with chamfered copings and plain kneelers. There are two storeys and an L-shaped plan, with a south front of six bays, the left two bays taller. The left part has sash windows with hood moulds, the upper windows with bowed balconies, and in the right part is a doorway and a staircase window. On the west front is a canted bay window with Gothic glazing and an embattled parapet.	II
Chalybeate Well House; 52.96009°N 1.50619°W		Early 19th century	The well house is in sandstone, and built into the hillside. There is a single storey, a central canted projection containing an open arcade of three pointed arches, over which is a band and an embattled parapet. The projection is flanked by single bays, the left bay containing a doorway with a pointed arch, and the right bay has a blind window with a pointed arch. Inside the arcade are iron railings enclosing the former pool.	II
Milepost; 52.95777°N 1.51183°W		Early 19th century	The milepost on the northwest side of Kedleston Road is in cast iron. It has a triangular plan, the upper part sloping to a gabled back plate. On the back plate is inscribed the distance to London and the name of the parish, and on the sides are the distances to Hulland Ward and Derby.	II
St Paul's Church; 52.96553°N 1.50285°W		1872–74	The church is in sandstone with Welsh slate roofs, and consists of a nave, north and south aisles, a south porch, a chancel with a south vestry, and a southwest steeple. The steeple has a tower with two stages, angle buttresses, and a two-light south window with a quatrefoil above, both with hood moulds. The upper stage contains paired bell openings, nook shafts with foliage capitals, gargoyles at the top corners, and a broach spire with two tiers of lucarnes.	II
War memorial, walls and railings 52.96566°N 1.50311°W	—	c. 1874	The war memorial in the churchyard of St Paul's Church is in the form of a Saxon cross. Attached to it are low sandstone walls with chamfered and moulded copings and iron railings. The wall is divided by eleven stone piers with chamfered copings, and between the piers is an openwork iron archway.	II
