= Henry Graham (missionary) =

Henry Graham (born in 1806) served as a missionary to Sierra Leone, Africa with the Church Missionary Society from 1829 to 1832. Graham served as the first medical missionary within the Church Missionary Society, one of the largest organizers of mission trips at the time. As such, Graham was a trailblazer in the role and worked to find appropriate balance between medical and religious duties and values in missionary service.

In addition to his medical efforts, Graham took it upon himself to reopen the area's Sunday school for adults and apprentices, helping to teach lessons in reading and scripture. Through successes and hardships, ranging from medical feats to the death of his wife, Graham remained steadfastly pious; he attributed all occurrences to God's greater plan.

In comparison to other missionaries and medical officers, Graham placed a rare emphasis on helping and learning from the natives of Sierra Leone. Due to his eagerness to learn from native colonial surgeon, Dr. Boyle, he contributed to introducing unfamiliar African medical practices to the CMS and England, such as the use of Ergot and Rye in midwifery. Graham made efforts to somewhat immerse himself into Sierra Leone's native population, studying the Eyó dialect through conversations with local Oku people. Graham demonstrates an alteration to the customary dynamic between missionary and native and strengthened relations in Sierra Leone.

Straying from his primary reason for recruitment, to provide medical assistance to those connected to the Mission in Sierra Leone, Graham dedicated much of his time to providing assistance to the natives, playing a role in his eventual removal from the Mission in 1832.

== Early life and education ==
Graham, originating from Oxford, was born in 1806 to parents Christopher and Sarah Graham. He was one of at least three children, with older sister, Mary Graham (1804), and younger brother, Robert Frederic Graham (1808). He attended Christian Missionary Society College, Islington in 1827 and studied medicine under Dr. Whiting, honorary medical advisor of the CMS's Committee of Correspondence (the board that supervised mission operations). Graham married his first wife, Susannah Pharoah on August 28, 1829, who died in Africa on March 31, 1831. Following her death, H. Graham married Phoebe Davey, née Goodwin, widow of Davey Thomas (d. 1831), a priest in Freetown.

== Mission ==
=== Call to Service / Journey ===
The Church Missionary Society's mission to Sierra Leone was 14 years old when Henry Graham was recruited. Prior to Mr. Graham's introduction, illness and death were common among the CMS Sierra Leone missionaries and the natives, with fever and dysentery being the most common afflictions. The resulting short service and often changing missionaries inhibited the mission's progress and impact in the area. The Society recruited Graham, their first ever medical missionary, to improve the health of their missionaries and students. Graham would temporarily reside at Freetown to become better acquainted with the effects of local disease on Europeans, and he would administer the Society's medicines to those in need in all parts of the colony, including some individuals not necessarily connected to the Mission if resources allowed. Graham would provide the Committee of Correspondence, back in London, with quarterly reports.

In December 1829, four new labourers including Mr. Graham, his wife Susannah Pharoah, Reverend John Murell, and Mr. John Warburton were added to the mission. The group sailed from Gravesend on October 12 and arrived in Sierra Leone on December 7. Mrs. and Mrs. Graham resided with Reverend Raban in Sierra Leone.

=== Medical Practice ===
Upon arriving in Sierra Leone, Graham understood that his medical education was far from complete. He remained eager to continue learning throughout his service, requesting medical books from the Society including Elements of Operative Midwifery by David Daniel Davis and The Study of Medicine by John Mason Good, commonly on surgery and operative midwifery. While not attending to patients or working in Gloucester's mission schools, Graham dedicated most of his time to studying medical works to improve his knowledge. Graham worked closely with and learned under native colonial surgeon Dr. Boyle, who treated patients in Freetown. Through Dr. Boyle, Graham discovered African medications not commonly used in England, such as the use of Ergot and Rye in midwifery, and introduced his findings to the CMS.

Fever and dysentery most commonly afflicted the missionaries and natives in Sierra Leone. Mr. Graham spent his time attending to the missionaries and their family members in Gloucester as well as the surrounding areas. Him and his wife were also often temporarily debilitated by illness; Mr. Graham suffered from intermittent fever and cholera morbus during his service. He provided the Society with quarterly reports regarding significant medical cases. He reported the recoveries of his patients humbly, attributing any medical success solely to the mercy of God without taking credit for any medical accomplishment.

While Graham was specifically recruited to provide medical aid to individuals within the mission, he chose to dedicate much of his time to treating natives. Graham provided advice and services to approximately a dozen natives, not connected to the mission, on a daily basis; he would treat the natives in their homes on occasion. Graham was troubled that few medical officers were willing to provide the women of Freetown with operative midwifery services because they were Black; he was anxious to gain more medical knowledge in the field in order to provide them every assistance himself. He expressed his desire to the CMS to return to England to study surgery under an experienced surgeon for a year in order to be more capable of helping.

=== Mission Schools ===
In addition to medical work, Graham and his wife dedicated themselves alongside Reverend Raban to the growth and improvement of schools in Gloucester, where boys were taught reading and scripture and girls were taught needlework. Mrs. Graham served as a school mistress, yet she was often indisposed due to illness, in which cases Mr. Graham would often take her place. Throughout Mr. and Mrs. Graham's service there was a significant uptick in overall attendance, children capable of reading scriptures, children able to read the alphabet or other books, and girls able to needlepoint.

The Sunday schools for adults and apprentices had generally been unsuccessful for the CMS mission in Sierra Leone, but Henry Graham, his wife, and the new group of missionaries were determined to see their revival. The Hastings Sunday school for adults and apprentices had been closed in the area upon Mr. Graham's arrival, so he took it upon himself to reopen the school and help teach lessons in reading and scripture. The Sunday school was often poorly attended and the adults made slow progress, yet Mr. Graham remained insistent. He reported that some adults who could barely read three words at its opening were able to read the Bible totally well in a couple of years. Over time, the Hastings Sunday school saw a significant increase in overall attendance.

=== Susannah Pharoah / Mrs. Graham ===
Mrs. Graham served as a schoolmistress, but was often indisposed due to illness before her death. Eager to serve, she made several attempts to teach when she was not in optimal condition and was later confined to her bed. She was known to be loyal and devoted with the natives. A native remarked,

“I was rejoiced to hear that during the whole of her extreme sufferings she exemplified much christian fortitude tempered with meekness and resignation: and that those around her had reason to believe that her death was gain.”

Mr. Graham was greatly pained by the loss of his most loved partner and afterwards pledged to only seek comfort in Christ in order to avoid further sadness and disappointment. He later remarried Phoebe Davey, the widow of another missionary.

=== Character ===
During Graham's service, he heard that people in England were suffering and acknowledged that many poor people troubled themselves to give money to the CMS. He notified the Parent Committee that he wished to temporarily give up his traveling allowance in their interest.

Immediately upon arriving in Sierra Leone, Henry Graham made efforts to learn the Eyó dialect through conversations with natives. This is now recognized as a dialect of Krio, the English-based creole language of Sierra Leone. He sought interaction with the natives and remarked that he could only depend on a word after having tested it with at least a dozen of the Okus. Reverend Raban, who Mr. Graham resided with, studied languages and had a particular interest in the Eyó dialect. Mr. Graham contributed significantly to Raban's study, collecting 200 new worlds in the language, half of which being new to Raban and the other half providing important variations to known words.

== Removal from mission ==
Due to a number of reasons, Graham was eventually discharged from his medical duties by the CMS's Committee of Correspondence in 1832. The committee was displeased with his desire to return to England to study surgery for a year in order to more effectively help the natives, seeing the request as inconsistent with this his reason for recruitment—to assist European missionaries in combating local diseases. Similarly, the CMS disproved of Graham's desire to become an ordained minister, considering it a loss of focus. In addition, Graham's marriage to the widowed Mrs. Davey, a woman accused of misconduct within CMS, led to the dissolution of Graham's connection to the Mission. Graham resided in Sierra Leone for the rest of his life as an apothecary.

== End of life ==
Henry Graham died in Sierra Leone in July 1837 from yellow fever. Sierra Leone was in a state of great unease at the time, with upwards of 40,000 individuals being ill with yellow fever. Following Graham's death, Mrs. Davey went on to marry J.W. Weeks, the eventual Bishop of Sierra Leone. Robert Frederic Graham's son, Henry's nephew, was born July 1, 1838, and named Henry Graham, likely after his uncle deceased eleven months prior.
