= Peter Hartwig (missionary) =

German missionary in Africa (1778–1815)

Peter Hartwig (1778, Prussia – 1815, Sierra Leone) was a German seminarian and medical missionary, who worked on behalf of the Church Missionary Society in West Africa. His work in Sierra Leone, specifically in Freetown, expanded the Church Missionary Society and accelerated Western influence in that area.

== Early life and education ==
At twenty-five Hartwig joined the Church Missionary Society (CMS) and began his studies alongside fellow Lutheran Melchior Renner at the Berlin Seminary Missionary School under Dr. Jänicke. He spent fifteen months in Clapham, England, where he learned both English and the Susu language. He studied Susu at the School for Africans under William Greaves, a missionary from Edinburgh who had previously worked in Sierra Leone before returning to the UK.

Hartwig's decision to become a missionary was motivated by his desire to avoid serving in the military. In a letter written by fellow missionary Gustavus Reinhold Nylander he said: "He did not like to be a soldier in the Prussian army and for fear of being forced to it was custom in Prussia, he joined the mission, only to get out of his native country by that means." (10 July 1807).

In 1804 Hartwig married Sarah Windsor, an Englishwoman who had worked as a governess in the household of Reverend John Venn. That same year, Hartwig was ordained as a Lutheran minister and left for West Africa.

== Mission work ==
Hartwig and Renner were sent to the Freetown in Sierra Leone. Freetown, as indicated by its name, was founded for formerly enslaved Africans who fought for the British Crown in the American Revolutionary War. The settlement struggled with frequent sickness and a limited food supply. The missionaries were given specific instructions and duties with the primary goal of converting the local Susu people to Christianity. Hartwig was supervised by a corresponding committee of Sierra Leone Company officials. He was instructed to maintain frequent contact with the CMS by sending periodical reports as well as keeping a journal describing his experiences.

Renner and Hartwig had a tense relationship, creating a strain on their work in Sierra Leone. For the first two years of the mission much of their reporting focused on the intense conflicts between the two of them. As Hartwig was learning Susu and Arabic, he was instructed to make regular journeys outside the colony to assess the character and customs of the people living further inland. His absence left Renner to shoulder the responsibilities in Freetown alone. Disagreements between then became violent, so much that colony officials assigned a newly-arrived missionary to accompany them and maintain order.

=== Struggles ===
Hartwig struggled with building local connections due to his ongoing health problems. Often bedridden from illness, opportunities for social interaction were restricted. His wife Sarah suffered from even more frequent illness as well.

In 1805 the Hartwigs traveled to Bullom Shore to recover. While they were away Renner was able to negotiate his appointment as chaplain of the Company's church in Freetown. When Peter returned he was almost immediately sent on a trip to the Rio Pongo from late February to May. The following year the Corresponding Committee returned Sarah back to London for health reasons. Although the Committee sent Hartwig on the Pongo trip for his health, he also assessed potential mission sites and ended up loving the area. When he returned to Freetown, he expressed his wish to continue to travel the Pongo. By March 1806 Hartwig failed to secure any role the Committee deemed useful or acceptable. Their dislike of Hartwig began to grow. They considered him incompetent and someone who needed to be controlled.

The language barrier was a difficult challenge. Missionaries were instructed to preach to the local populations in English. Since English was not Harwig's native language it was a hurdle. Hartwig's accent often drew criticism, His sermons were difficult to understand. In letters fellow missionaries noted his struggles with the language and the Corresponding Committee blamed his accent for his ineffectiveness in reaching the community.

He did have linguistic talents, demonstrated by his translations into Susu and Arabic, but his difficulties with English persisted. In 1807 he left the colony without authorization, traveled to Rio Pongo, taking some Committee property with him. This resulted in his dismissal and accusations of involvement in the slave trade, although his final letters suggest another story:

"I am as put in irons. I will go into the Rio Pongas but I am limited on all sides. So I go with a slave dealer & speak kindly to him, I am called one too. Will I avoid it, there is no other way. But then again I have to please the corrupt fancy of a Committee here. What Disasters” (29 January 1807).

Hartwig's correspondence was infrequent, upsetting the CMS. With the discovery of numerous letters he sent to friends abroad, they felt he was not taking his responsibilities seriously, leading to his dismissal in 1807.

== Later life ==
Hartwig returned to Sierra Leone in 1814, employed as a linguist and translator. The following year, he died from yellow fever. His wife died six weeks later. Hartwig served the Church Missionary Society for four years and lived in Sierra Leone for an additional seven years, independent of the Society.
