= Sarah Hartwig (missionary) =

English missionary and educator

Sarah Hartwig (24 February, 1773 York - 30 April 1815, Freetown) was an English missionary teacher in Sierra Leone, West Africa.

She was born Sarah Windsor (or Winsor) in York, England. She worked as a governess in Surrey.

In 1804, she married Peter Hartwig a German missionary from Prussia in Clapham, London. He entered service of the Church Missionary Society set up by the Church of England. The same year, she followed him to Freetown in Sierra Leone with two of his colleagues. They were the first British missionaries of the Anglican Church in Africa. She was also the first wife of a British missionary to travel to Africa (female missionaries did not yet exist) and as such became the first British women missionary active in Africa.

Between 1804 and 1806, she managed a missionary school attached to her home in Freetown upon the encouragement of Governor William Day. She was the first woman to manage a school in Africa, the first woman to teach at such a school, and the first to manage an African school which accepted girls as well as boys. This was also one of the first schools in Freetown. The school was defined as a state school and she was given her salary by the governor, which made her a civil servant with status in Freetown.

She was sent back to England in 1806 because of the conflict between her spouse and vice governor Thomas Ludlam.

Her widower abandoned his missionary work in 1807 and engaged in the slave trade, marrying an African wife and settling on the Rio Pongo.

== See also ==
- Julia Sass
