= Melchior Renner =

Melchior Renner (1770–1821) was a German missionary who served in Sierra Leone. Renner and Peter Hartwig, both German Lutherans, were the first CMS missionaries in Africa, recruited to a mission in Freetown, Sierra Leone in 1804. In 1808, Renner founded a station among the Susu people, attempted to learn the Susu language, and worked with his wife Elizabeth to run schools on the Rio Pongas in Sierra Leone. Elizabeth and Melchior were an interracial marriage in a mission adjacent to an area with active slave trading. Renner died at the age of 41 after 11 years serving the CMS.

== Early life ==
While Renner's official birthplace is noted as Wurtermberg, his letters to London indicated his hometown as Grodenheim, though no official CMS histories have confirmed this.

In 1804, Elizabeth Renner became a housekeeper to Renner in Freetown. They married in 1808. Elizabeth was a black Canadian-born missionary teacher who taught in Sierra Leone after emigrating from Nova Scotia in 1792. The inter-racial aspects of the marriage were commented on by other missionaries.

== Mission ==
In 1801, Renner along with Hartwig was recruited by, and trained with, the Berlin Mission seminary. They then spent 15 months in Clapham, England studying Susu, were later sent to Germany to be ordained as Lutherans in 1803.

=== Freetown ===
They were then accepted by the Church Missionary Society and sailed from Portsmouth to Freetown, Sierra Leone, arriving on 14th April 1804. They first set out to get familiar with the land, language, habits, and manners of the Susu people. During this time they were both attacked aggressively by fever and continued on their mission. They spoke of God, the necessity of faith, and the influence of the Holy Spirit to natives. Both Hartwig's and Renner's letters home highlighted challenges presented in Sierra Leone, like that of food scarcity and frequent sickness.

Eventually, Hartwig ventured northeast while Renner remained in Freetown. There, Renner diligently worked to find Africans to convert, although between natural and physical challenges he was unable to fulfill this duty. By 1806 Hartwig and Renner had found themselves in service together again and Renner talked about increasing disagreements between them. A dispute had risen between them in regards to seniority. The disputes seemed to continue eventually spiraling out of control despite direct orders from London and the CMS. As a result they were to be accompanied by a newly-arrived missionary because of how violent their disagreements had become.

=== Bashia ===
Once stationed at Bashia, Renner was refocused by religion and worked with parishioners, on a much larger scale than other German speaking CMS members that sought out new converts. The Bashia mission was set up in a former "slave factory" in a geograqphic area that had abolished slavery. Neighboring communities up the Pongo River, however, despite the 1807 Act of Abolition, were actively trading slaves in 1810.

Renner arriving in the Bashia settlement in Rio Pongas created and carried out a plan with the following points:

- Have Divine Service every Sunday
- Abstain from traffic with natives on Sunday
- Hold family prayers every morning and evening; as well as require attendance of everyone on the premise who understood English
- Hold prayer meeting in German on the first Monday of the month (more for the missionaries)
- Receive for instruction the children of all traders, on condition that the parents would provide food and clothing.

By this time Renner and other missionaries were prepared to diffuse their religion into the people and the Church Missionary Society began to direct its attention to establishing institutions under the protection of the British Government. In late 1812, the growing mission and community started to experience significant conflict with new illegal slave traders. Renner continued teaching in the Bashia settlement until he returned to Freetown in 1814 where he was put temporarily in charge of the Christian Institution leaving Elizabeth as the leader of the mission. Melchoir returned to Bashia in 1815. In late 1815, the mission experienced an epidemic of yellow fever. The mission also experienced increasing numbers of conflicts and acts of arson attributed to the illegal slave traders and later identified to be caused by Jellorum Harrison who was paid by John Ormond. Ormond was the descendant of the owner of the original "Slave factory" in Bashia. By 1817, the CMS ordered the mission closed due to the belief that the slave trade and the mission could not co-exist and the conflict and damage was too costly.

=== Leopold ===
In 1818, the Renners moved to Leopold, a growing community of individuals who were rescued from illegal slave ships and returned to the Freetown area. The work was considered difficult with multiple administrative and missionary tasks needed within the growing population. In 1819, Melchior was asked to temporally serve in Freetown while Elizabeth remained in Leopold. Upon returning to Leopold, reports of public drunkness of Melichior led to the termination of their work in February 1821.

== Later life and death ==
Melchior was removed from the Leopold mission and assigned to the colonial town of Kent as a missionary. The town was on the coast outside of Freetown. By September 1821, Melchior Renner developed jaundice and died in Kent 8 September 1821. The CMS did not grant the funds or provide a headstone for his grave.
