= Mike Smith (footballer, born 1935) =

English footballer

Personal information
- Date of birth: 22 September 1935
- Place of birth: Quarndon, England
- Date of death: 22 April 2013 (aged 77)
- Position: Centre half

Youth career
- Derby County

Senior career*
Years	Team	Apps	(Gls)
1957–1961	Derby County	22	(0)
1961–1966	Bradford City	134	(0)
- Crewton Sports
- Lockheed Leamington
Total		156	(0)
- * Club domestic league appearances and goals

Michael J. Smith, known as Mike Smith (22 September 1935 – 22 April 2013) was an English professional footballer who played as a centre half. Active between 1956 and 1966, Smith made over 150 appearances in the Football League for two clubs.

== Career ==
Born in Quarndon, Smith played for Derby County, Bradford City, Crewton Sports and Lockheed Leamington. For Bradford City, he made 134 appearances in the Football League; he also made 2 FA Cup appearances.

== Later life and death ==
Smith died on 22 April 2013, at the age of 77.

== Sources ==
- Frost, Terry (1988). Bradford City A Complete Record 1903-1988. Breedon Books Sport. ISBN 0-907969-38-0.
