= John Weeks (bishop) =

Anglican Bishop of Sierra Leone (1799–1857)

John Wills Weeks (1799–1857) was the Anglican Bishop of Sierra Leone from 1855 until his death in Sierra Leone two years later.

John Wills Weeks was born in Dartmouth, Devon, in 1799 and baptised at St Petrox Church there 8 Oct 1799. A CMS missionary in Sierra Leone from 1825 to 1844 when ill-health caused his return to England, he became incumbent of St Thomas's Church and headmaster of Cranbrook School, Lambeth until his appointment to the episcopate. He became a Doctor of Divinity (DD).

On 7 December 1826, Weeks married his first wife Anna Pope, née Haynes, widow of John Pope, a missionary who died after only 6 months of service in Sierra Leone. She predeceased him 10 January 1839. His second wife Phoebe Graham, née Davey, née Goodwin, from Bungay in Suffolk, widow of Henry Graham, died in 1866 and was buried in West Norwood.

Weeks died on March 25, 1857. His papers are held at the University of Birmingham.

Church of England titles
Preceded by Owen Vidal	Bishop of Sierra Leone; 1855–1857	Succeeded by John Bowen
