= John Walmsley (bishop) =

English Anglican missionary bishop

John Walmsley (14 October 1867, in Hereford – 9 December 1922, in Freetown) was an English Anglican missionary bishop for the Anglican Diocese of Sierra Leone in the early twentieth century, from 1910 to his death in 1922.

Walmsley was the son of George Walmsley, of Hereford. He was educated in Hereford, and at Brasenose College, Oxford, where he was Somerset Scholar, and Senior Hall Greek Testament Prizeman. He was made deacon in 1890, and ordained priest in the Church of England by the Bishop of Exeter in 1891. After a curacy at Stokenham he was Vice-Principal of Wycliffe Hall, Oxford from 1894 to 1898. He held incumbencies at St Giles, Normanton-by-Derby and St Ann, Nottingham.

Walmsley served as Bishop of Sierra Leone from 1910 until his death of Blackwater fever, in a nursing home in Freetown in 1922.
