= Owen Vidal =

English-born Sierra Leonean Anglican bishop

Owen Emeric Vidal (1819–1854) was the first Anglican Bishop of Sierra Leone and West Africa from 1852 until his death three years later.

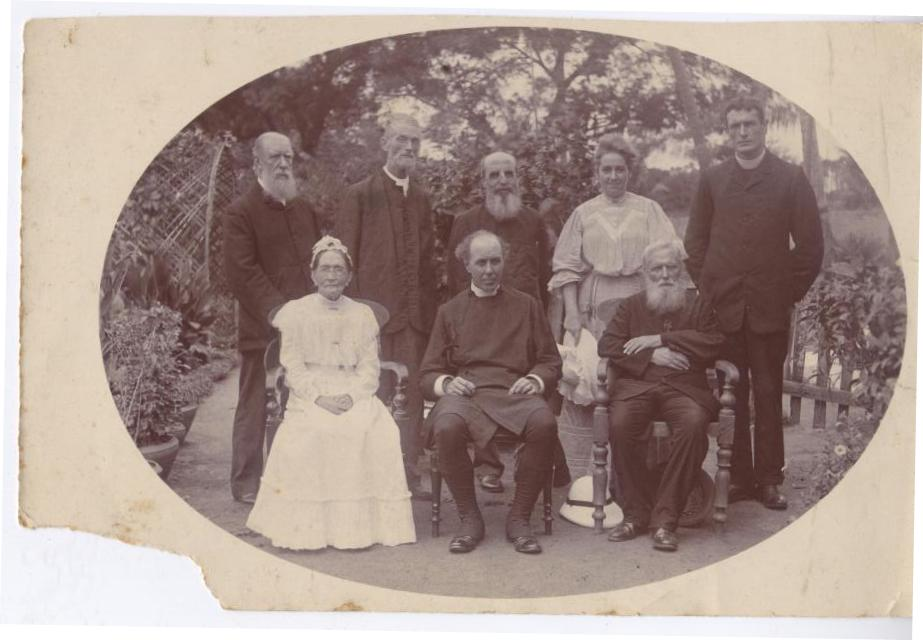
Bishop Owen Emeric Vidal (far right) and probably bishop Ashurst Gilbert of Chichester (seated, centre), probably on the occasion of Bishop Vidal's departure for Sierra Leone in mid-1852. Photo from Vidal family archives.

== Life ==
Vidal was the son of Emeric Essex Vidal and his wife Anna Jane Capper, daughter of the Rev. James Capper, born at Easthampstead. He was educated at St Paul's School, Southsea. He matriculated at St John's College, Cambridge, in 1838, where he graduated bachelor of arts in 1842 and master of arts in 1845; he was awarded a doctorate of divinity in 1852.

Ordained deacon in March 1843, Vidal was ordained priest in December of the same year. He was Vicar of Holy Trinity, Upper Dicker until his elevation to the episcopate. The ceremony took place on Whit Sunday, May 1852, in Lambeth Palace, where the archbishop of Canterbury was assisted by the Bishops of London, Chichester, Oxford, and Cape Town. Vidal was the first bishop of Sierra Leone, a see that comprised all British possessions on the west coast of Africa between the latitudes of 20 degrees north and 20 degrees south, and in particular the colonies of Sierra Leone, the Gambia, and the Gold Coast.

Vidal brought his sick wife back to England in 1854, then returned to Lagos later that same year where he ordained Thomas Babington Macaulay (Nigeria) and Thomas King, who were the first Africans admitted to the ministry of the Anglican Church upon their own soil. Vidal died while on a sea voyage back to Sierra Leone after his visit to the churches in Yorubaland, on or about 23 December 1854, and was buried at Freetown on 27 December 1854.

== Family ==
Vidal married in 1852 Anne Adelaide Hoare, the fourth daughter of the Rev. Henry Hoare, vicar of Framfield. They had one daughter, Annie Selina Hoare Vidal.

== Publications ==
A Vocabulary of the Yoruba Language (with Samuel Adjai Crowther) (1852)

Church of England titles
Preceded by Inaugural appointment	Bishop of Sierra Leone; 1852 – 1854	Succeeded by John Wills Weeks
