= Edward Beckles =

Edward Hyndman Beckles
- Bishop of Sierra Leone
- Church: Church of England
- In office: 1860–1869
- Predecessor: John Bowen
- Successor: Henry Cheetham

Orders
- Ordination: 1844
- Consecration: 1860

Personal details
- Born: February 14, 1816 Barbados
- Died: December 5, 1902 Lewisham, England
- Spouse: Margaret Simpson Walcott
- Education: Codrington College, Barbados

Edward Hyndman Beckles (14 February 1816 – 5 December 1902) was the Anglican Bishop of Sierra Leone from 1860 until 1869.

Beckles was born in Barbados in 1816, the son of John Alleyne Beckles (descended from the Beckles family of Durham) and Elizabeth née Spooner. His father was at that time Chief Judge of the Court of Vice Admiralty of Barbados, later becoming President of the Legislative Council of Barbados. Among his siblings was the lawyer Samuel Husband Beckles (1814–1890). He was educated at Codrington College Barbados, ordained deacon in 1843 and priest in 1844. He started as curate of Holy Trinity, Port of Spain, then served for six years at St. Michael, Diego Martin, Trinidad, where he was also chaplain to the forces. After a brief period in the United Kingdom, where he was curate of London-churches in Mile End and Lisson Grove, he returned to the West Indies in 1853 as rector of St Peter's, Saint Kitts.

He was nominated Bishop of Sierra Leone in 1860, but resigned in 1869 and moved to the United Kingdom. After resigning his episcopal see he was Minister of Berkeley Chapel, Mayfair, Rector of Wootton, Kent and finally Vicar of St Peter, Bethnal Green from 1873. In February 1877 he was appointed Superintending Bishop of the English Episcopalian congregations in Scotland.

At some point he gained a Doctorate of Divinity (DD).

Beckles died in Lewisham on 5 December 1902.

He married in 1837 Margaret Simpson Walcott (4 November 1815 – 3 April 1900), daughter of Edward Brace Walcott and Mary Daxon. She died in Hastings on 3 April 1900, aged 84 years. There were 8 children, including several sons with ecclesiastical careers.

Church of England titles
Preceded by John Bowen	Bishop of Sierra Leone; 1860–1869	Succeeded by Henry Cheetham
