= Graham Ingham =

Ingham (seated between two women) with the Lagos Mission in 1885.

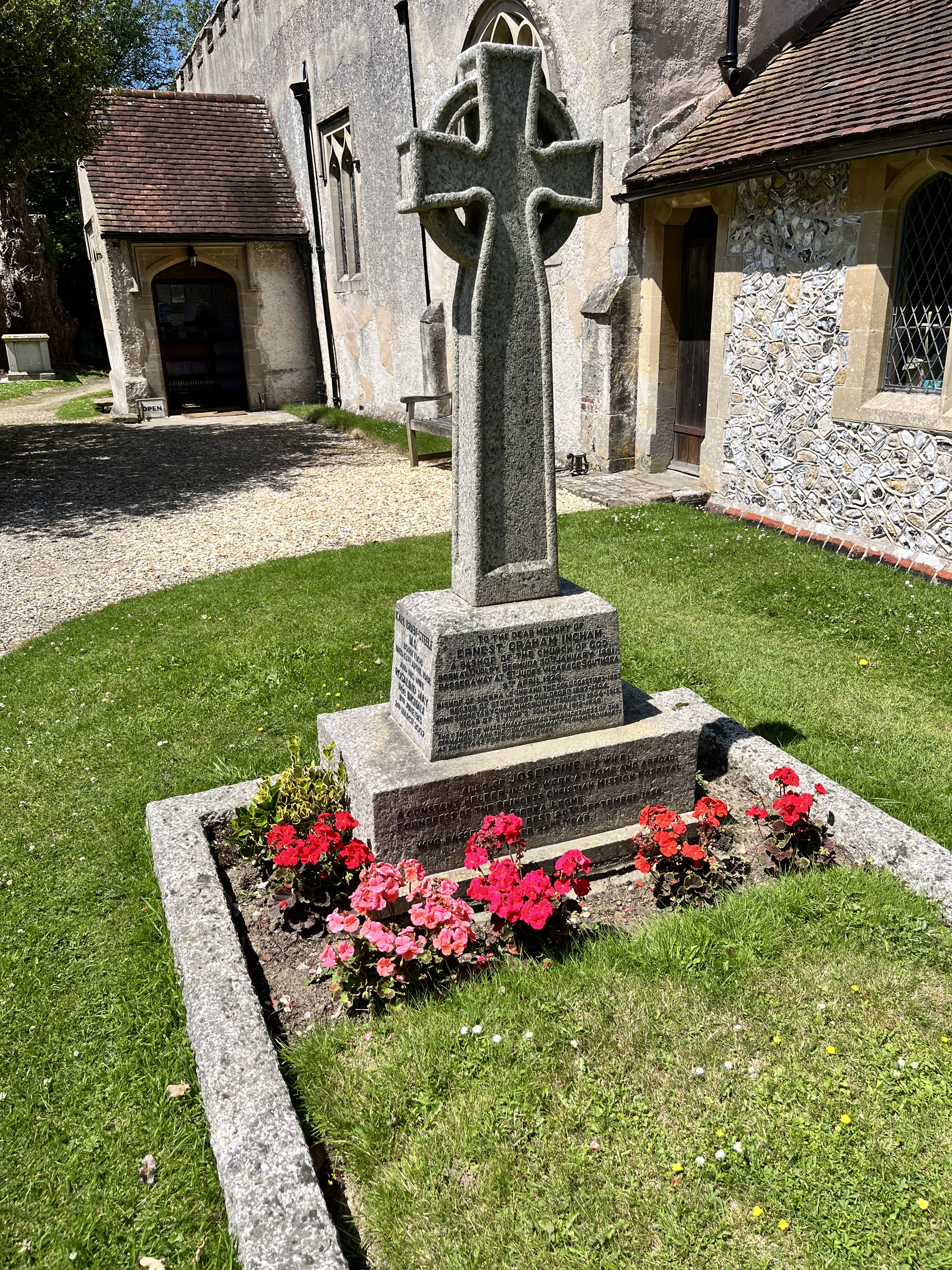
Ingham's grave in Aldingbourne churchyard.

Ernest Graham Ingham (30 January 1851 – 9 April 1926) was an eminent Anglican bishop and author living at the end of the 19th and beginning of the 20th centuries.

== Life ==
Ingham was born in Bermuda, the seventh child and third son of Samuel Saltus Ingham, Speaker of the House of Assembly of Bermuda. He was educated at Bishop's College School in Canada and Christ's College, Cambridge — gaining his Cambridge Master of Arts (MA Cantab) —, and ordained in 1877. He was Organizing Secretary of the Church Missionary Society (CMS) for West Yorkshire and then Vicar of St Matthew's, Leeds until his appointment to the episcopate as the fifth Bishop of Sierra Leone.

On returning to England he was Rector of Stoke-next-Guildford from 1897 to 1904, Home Secretary of the CMS until 1912 and finally Vicar of St Jude's, Southsea. At some point, he became a Doctor of Divinity (DD).

He was buried in the churchyard at Aldingbourne, West Sussex.

== Works ==
- Sierra Leone after a Hundred Years, 1894
- From Japan to Jerusalem, 1911 (Publisher: London : Church Missionary Society)
- Sketches in Western Canada, 1913

Church of England titles
Preceded by Henry Cheetham	Bishop of Sierra Leone; 1883–1897	Succeeded by John Taylor Smith
