= Henry Cheetham =

Henry Cheetham (27 April 1827 – 22 December 1899) was an Anglican bishop, Bishop of Sierra Leone from 1870 until 1882.

== Life ==
Henry Cheetham was born in Nottingham and educated in Nottingham and at Christ's College, Cambridge. Ordained in 1856, he was Vicar of Quarndon, Derbyshire until his appointment to the colonial episcopate. He died in Bournemouth on 22 December 1899. Doctor of Divinity (DD) 1871.

== Family ==
Cheetham married, firstly, in 1856, Ann Eaton, daughter of Richard Eaton of Dovecote House, Ashover. He married, secondly, on 6 January 1875, at Ullenhall church, Mary Rosa Newton, one of the officiating clergy being her brother Horace Newton. She died in Sierra Leone, later that year. He married, thirdly, in 1882, Isabelle Rutter, daughter of William Rutter of Clapton.

Church of England titles
Preceded by Edward Beckles	Bishop of Sierra Leone; 1870–1882	Succeeded by Graham Ingham
