= John Bowen (bishop) =

Anglican missionary and bishop

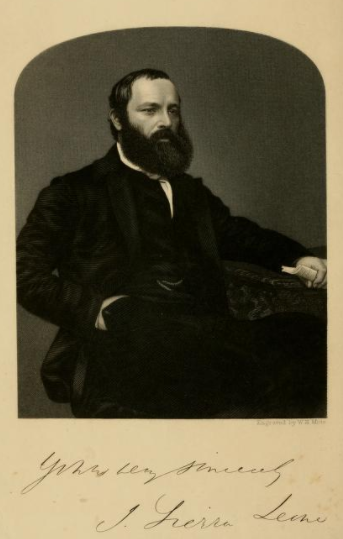
John Bowen, Frontispiece from The Memorials of John Bowen (1862)

John Bowen LL.D. (21 November 1815 – 2 June 1859) was an Anglican bishop in Sierra Leone.

Bowen, son of Thomas Bowen, captain in the 85th regiment, by his third wife, Mary, daughter of the Rev. John Evans, chaplain to the garrison at Placentia, Newfoundland, was born at Court, near Fishguard, Pembrokeshire. At twelve years of age he was sent to school at Merlin's Vale, near Haverfordwest, and in 1830 continued his studies at the same place under the care of the Rev. David Adams. He entered Trinity College, Dublin in 1840.

He emigrated to Canada in April 1835, and took a farm at Dunnville, Ontario, on the shores of Lake Erie, where, during the rebellion of 1837–8, he served in the militia. On Sunday, 6 March 1842, he heard a sermon in the church at Lakeshore, Ontario, which made a great impression on his mind, and ultimately led to a desire to prepare himself for the ministerial office.

A favourable opportunity having occurred for disposing of his farm advantageously, he returned to England, and in January 1843 entered himself at Trinity College, Dublin, where he graduated B.A. in 1847, and became LL.B. and LL.D. ten years later.

== Ecclesiastic career ==
His first appointment was to the assistant-curacy of Knaresborough, Yorkshire, in 1848. While residing here he asked the Church Missionary Society to allow him to visit their numerous foreign stations. The society suggested that he should proceed to Jerusalem, there to confer with Bishop Gobat, and then to visit the missionary stations at Syra, Smyrna, and Cairo; afterwards to journey to Mount Lebanon, Nablous, and other places in Syria, and thence to proceed to Mosul by Constantinople and Trebizond, returning by Bagdad and Damascus to Jerusalem. All this he accomplished, going through many hardships and dangers, and returning to England in December 1851.

In 1853 he was named, by the Marquis of Huntly, rector of Orton-Longueville with Botolph Bridge in Huntingdonshire. Having obtained permission from his bishop, he again left England in September 1854, and was absent in the East until July 1856. He had by this time made such good use of his opportunities for the study of Arabic, that he was able to preach with fluency in that difficult language.

=== Bishop of Sierra Leone ===
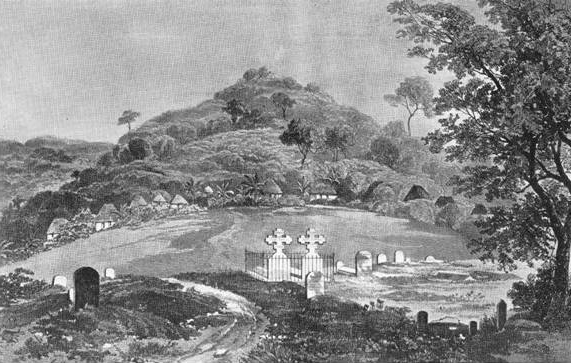
View of the New Burial Ground, Freetown by Julia Sass which appeared in The Memorials of John Bowen (1862). The two crosses mark the grave stones of John Bowen and his wife

He was consecrated bishop of Sierra Leone on 21 September by John Bird Sumner, the Archbishop of Canterbury, George Davys, the Bishop of Peterborough and George Smith Bishop of Victoria.

On 24 November 1857, he married Catharine Butler, second daughter of Dr. George Butler, dean of Peterborough. They sailed for Sierra Leone two days later. However their stay there was brief. His wife died at Freetown, after giving birth to a stillborn son, on 4 August 1858. The bishop died the following year. He had recovered from several attacks of yellow fever. However a malignant fever broke out in the colony, of which he died. He had occupied the see two years and five months.

His sister edited The Memorials of John Bowen primarily composed of his letters and journals.

Church of England titles
Preceded by John Weeks	Bishop of Sierra Leone; 1857 – 1860	Succeeded by Edward Beckles
