= Edmund Elwin =

Edmund Henry Elwin, DD (18 September 1871 – 10 November 1909) was an English Anglican missionary and Anglican Bishop of Sierra Leone.

== Biography ==
Elwin was educated at Dover College and Merton College, Oxford, England, where he gained a third class degree in Theology. Later he studied at Wycliffe Hall in Oxford, a theological training college in the Evangelical tradition.

After his curacy in Oxford, Edmund Elwin became a missionary in Sierra Leone and soon became Vice Principal of Fourah Bay College which was affiliated to Durham University. He eventually became Principal and Secretary of the Sierra Leone Mission. When the then Bishop of Sierra Leone became Chaplain General to the British Forces in November 1901, Elwin was appointed his successor. He was consecrated as Bishop by the Archbishop of Canterbury in Westminster Cathedral on 25 January 1902.

In March 1902 he received the degree Doctor of Divinity (Honoris causa) from the University of Oxford, and was elected a Fellow of the Royal Colonial Institute.

Elwin died of yellow fever in Sierra Leone on 10 November 1909, a few weeks before being due to return to England as the appointed Bishop of Bristol. He was the father of Verrier Elwin.
