= Qasim Umar Sokoto =

Sheikh Allamah Qasim Umar Sokoto
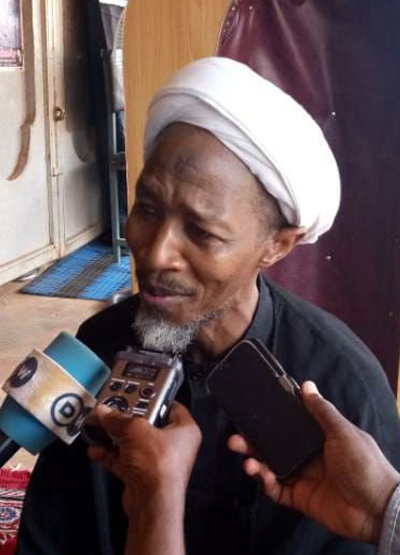
- An image of the late Hujjat al-Islam Qasim Umar Sokoto, February 2017.
- Born: Muhammad Qaseem Umar; 28 September 1969 (17 Rajab 1389); Sokoto, Nigeria
- Died: February 5, 2018; Sokoto, Nigeria
- Other name: Abu Khadeejah
- Occupation: Teacher
- Years active: 1980s - 2018
- Known for: Activist and teacher under the Islamic Movement in Sokoto
- Spouse: Sa'adiyyah Ahmad
- Children: Khadeejah Muhammad Ahmad Hamid Fatimah Aminah
- Relatives: Dahiru Umar
- Awards: Habibullah Award

Qasim Umar Sokoto (killed 5 February 2018) was a contributor to the Islamic Movement of Nigeria, the prayer leader and Islamic teacher in Sokoto, the Northern city of Nigeria.

On 9 January 2018, during a demonstration of Shia people in Abuja, demanding the release of leader of Islamic Movement in Nigeria Ibrahim Zakzaky, Qasim was shot and injured by Nigerian Police, while two others were killed. After 26 days of treatment at a private facility in Kano, he died on 5 February 2018.

== Biography ==
Shaheed Muhammad Qaseem Umar was born in Sokoto State, Nigeria, into the well-known family of Alhaji Ummaru Sanda Gudu. His father was a prominent businessman in Northern Nigeria who died on March 3, 1980, in an airplane crash while traveling to Kano State. His mother, Hajiya Hauwa’u Ahmad, popularly known as Hajiya Kulu, is still alive and resides in Sokoto.

Shaheed Qaseem began his educational journey in his hometown of Sokoto. During the 1970s-1980s era, many families—especially in rural areas—prioritized Islamic education over what was commonly referred to as Western education (“Boko”). Like many children of his time, he first attended a traditional 'Zaure' class where he completed the recitation of the Qur’an and studied other foundational Islamic texts. Later, in his twenties, he memorized the entire Qur’an alongside one of his close friends.

In 1994, Shaheed Qaseem married Sa’adiyya Ahmad. Their marriage was blessed with six children: three daughters and three sons. His wife, Sa’adiyya Ahmad, passed away in 2015 after a long illness, shortly after Shaheed Qaseem was released from prison. During his imprisonment, he also suffered the loss of his daughter Aminah. Earlier, he had lost another beloved daughter only months before his arrest in 2007. Despite these personal tragedies, he did not remarry.

Shaheed Qaseem became actively involved in Islamic activism in the 1980s and soon emerged as one of the leading figures of the Islam Movement in Sokoto. Throughout his life, he was imprisoned three times: first in the 1980s, again in the 1990s, and finally in 2007, which became his longest imprisonment lasting six years. During this period, he was held in Sokoto Prison and later transferred to Awka Prison. In 2013, the Federal High Court discharged and acquitted him along with 109 others.

== Shaheed Qaseem and the Zaria Massacre (2015) ==
Shortly before the tragic events in Zaria, Shaheed Qaseem had returned from Lebanon with Shaheed Hammad Zakzaky after attending a two-day program on Palestine. The massacre carried out by the Nigerian Army began on Saturday afternoon at the Husainiyyah Baqiyyatullah in Zaria and continued for several days. Later that same night, around 10 p.m., the attack expanded to the residence of Sheikh Zakzaky in Gyallesu.

Shaheed Qaseem was among the many people present at the Sheikh’s residence and witnessed the atrocities firsthand. On Sunday afternoon, he left Gyallesu on the orders of Sheikh Zakzaky in order to gather reinforcements. However, due to the sudden nature of the attack and the lack of available support, he was unable to mobilize enough people. When he returned to Gyallesu, it was already too late: the Sheikh’s residence had been heavily attacked, set ablaze, and many people had been killed.

On the morning of December 14, 2015, Shaheed Qaseem received a call from Sheikh Zakzaky, who had been injured along with members of his family. During that call, the Sheikh informed him about the situation and gave instructions regarding several matters in case he did not survive his injuries. He also instructed Shaheed Qaseem to meet with Muhammad, the Sheikh’s eldest son, to prepare and carry out necessary responsibilities. From that moment onward, Shaheed Qaseem dedicated himself tirelessly to the struggle for the Sheikh’s freedom. He traveled across different parts of Nigeria advocating for his release, which placed him under heavy surveillance by security forces and led to warrants being issued against him.

== Abuja Struggle and death ==
In January 2018, a series of daily protests began in Abuja demanding the release of Sheikh Zakzaky, whose health was reportedly deteriorating in detention. These protests came after years of unanswered appeals and demonstrations. On the second day of the protests, Shaheed Qaseem was shot with what was described as a poisonous bullet. The injuries eventually led to his martyrdom on February 5, 2018, in Kano State.

Shaheed Muhammad Qaseem Umar was later laid to rest in his hometown in Sokoto State.

Following his death, the Islamic Movement issued a statement and announced that the Federal Government must bear responsibility for his death since he was shot by its agents while peacefully protesting the illegal detention of Sheikh Zakzaky – the leader of the Islamic Movement in Nigeria.

== See also ==
- Religion in Nigeria
- Shia in Nigeria
