= Blasphemy in Nigeria =

The Federal Republic of Nigeria operates two court systems. Both systems can punish blasphemy (an insult that shows contempt, disrespect or lack of reverence concerning a deity, an object considered sacred or something considered inviolable). The Constitution provides a customary (irreligious) system and a system that incorporates Sharia. The customary system prohibits blasphemy by section 204 of Nigeria's Criminal Code.

== Laws ==
Section 204 of Nigeria's Criminal Code is entitled "insult to religion". The section states:

Any person who does an act which any class of persons consider as a public insult on their religion, with the intention that they should consider the act such an insult, and any person who does an unlawful act with the knowledge that any class of persons will consider it such an insult, is guilty of a misdemeanour, and is liable to imprisonment for two years.

The prohibition against blasphemy in the Criminal Code and the prohibition recognized by Sharia may not be lawful because Section 38 of the Constitution entitles every Nigerian to freedom of thought, conscience, and religion, and Section 39 gives every Nigerian the right to freedom of expression.

Twelve out of Nigeria's thirty-six states have Sunni Islam as the dominant religion. In 1999, those states chose to have Sharia courts as well as Customary courts. A Sharia court may treat blasphemy as deserving of several punishments up to, and including, execution.

== Vigilantism ==
The system of law enforcement in Nigeria is beset by a lack of resources, sectarian loyalties, and corruption. As a consequence, vigilantism often goes unpunished. Vigilantism frequently occurs after an accusation of blasphemy.

== Selected cases ==
On 14 July 1999, in the village of Randali in Kebbi State, a Muslim mob beheaded Abdullahi Umaru for alleged blasphemy against Muhammad.

On 20 November 2002, Muslim and Christian mobs rampaged in the cities of Kaduna and Abuja. The rampage began after an article in a daily newspaper, Thisday, suggested that Muhammad would have approved of a Miss World pageant that was taking place in Abuja. Thisday columnist Isioma Daniel wrote that Muhammad would probably have taken a wife from among the contestants. Muslim mobs accused the newspaper of blasphemy, and burned down its office building in Kaduna. Then the mobs attacked churches and properties owned by Christians. Christian mobs confronted the Muslim mobs. Soldiers and police intervened. About two hundred and fifty people died. Daniel fled Nigeria ahead of a fatwa that called upon Muslims to kill her.

In February 2006 in Bauchi State, Florence Chukwu, a Christian teacher, confiscated a copy of a Quran from a pupil who was reading it during an English lesson. The incident provoked rioting by Muslims. The riot killed more than twenty Christians and destroyed two churches.

In February 2006, thousands of Muslim rioters went on rampages in different states. The rioters burned churches, torched Christian shops and homes, and killed Christians. The reason for the violence was ostensibly outrage at the publication in the Danish magazine Jyllands-Posten of cartoons that some Muslims consider blasphemous.

On 21 March 2007, a mob of Muslim students and neighbourhood extremists beat to death Christianah Oluwatoyin Oluwasesin, a mother of two and a teacher at Government Secondary School of Gandu in the city of Gombe. A student complained that Oluwasesin, a Christian, had touched a bag which allegedly contained a Quran, and had thereby defiled the Quran.

On 28 September 2007, a Muslim mob rioted at Tudun Wada in Kano State. The mob killed nine Christians, burned several churches, and destroyed the homes and businesses of some non-Muslims. The Muslims complained that Christian students had drawn a picture of Muhammad. The Christians reported that the violence erupted after they had prevented one of their members from converting to Islam.

In October 2007, a Sharia court convicted Sani Kabili, a Christian and a father of six, of the town of Kano, of blasphemy against Muhammad. The court sentenced Kabili to three years in prison. In February 2009, an appeal court overturned the conviction.

On 4 February 2008, a Muslim mob besieged a police station and set it on fire in the city of Yano in Bauchi State. The police station was the refuge of a Christian woman whom the mob accused of desecrating the Quran. One report said that the woman had spurned an offer of marriage from a Muslim man, and that he and his companions had seized the opportunity to riot. In the ensuing violence, five churches were set alight by Muslims, Christian shops were torched, and policemen's homes were attacked. The police arrested 1000 children.

On 9 February 2008, a Muslim mob rioted in the town of Sumaila in Kano State. The mob acted upon the alleged distribution of a leaflet that allegedly slandered Muhammad. The mob killed a Christian police inspector and two civilians, and wounded twenty others. The mob set fire to vehicles and destroyed the police station.

On 20 April 2008, Muslim rioters in the city of Kano burned the shops and vehicles of Christian merchants after one allegedly disparaged Muhammad.

On 9 August 2008, a Muslim mob in Kano State beat to death a fifty-year-old Muslim man who allegedly blasphemed Muhammad.

On 19 June 2009, a Muslim mob in the town of Sara in Jigawa State burned a police outpost and injured about twelve people over an alleged blasphemy against the Islamic prophet Muhammad. The mob complained that someone was distributing blasphemous pamphlets, and it demanded that the police give up a mad man who had sought safety at the police outpost.

On 10 August 2020, a Kano State Shariah court sentenced two people for the offence of blasphemy against the prophet Muhammad. Yahaya Sharif-Aminu (22 years old) was sentenced to death by hanging. He was accused of having blasphemed in his song which he circulated on WhatsApp in March 2020. Following this incident, his family home was burnt down. Omar Farouq (13 years old) was sentenced to 10 years in prison for blasphemy. His lawyer appealed on 7 September, saying that his sentence violated the African Charter of the Rights and Welfare of a Child and the Nigerian constitution.

In April 2022, a Nigerian atheist in Kano received a 24-year prison sentence after pleading guilty to blasphemy charges.

On 12 May 2022, Deborah Samuel Yakubu, a second-year college student, was stoned and her body set on fire by a mob in Sokoto after being accused of blasphemy against the Islamic Prophet Muhammad. Yakubu had allegedly made a comment on a WhatsApp group, criticizing the religion-related posts that Muslim classmates discussed in the study group she believed should have been reserved for academic purposes.

On 25 June 2023, Usman Buda of Sokoto was stoned to death by a mob, accusing Buda of blasphemy. On 30th August 2025, a woman food vendor named Amaye - was burnt alive to death by a mob in northern Nigeria's Niger state when her rejection to a marriage proposal was presumed blasphemous.

== See also ==
- Christianity in Nigeria
- Islam in Nigeria
- Persecution of Christians: Nigeria
- Religion in Nigeria
- Sharia in Nigeria
- Shia in Nigeria
- Status of religious freedom by country: Nigeria
