= Anchuna =

Anchuna Ancuna, Anchina, Anchona
- Town
- Location within Nigeria
- Coordinates: 09°59′30″N 08°6′13″E
- Country: Nigeria
- State: Kaduna State
- LGA: Zangon Kataf
- Chiefdom: Akulu

Government
  - Type: Elective monarchy
- Elevation: 765 m (2,510 ft)
- Time zone: UTC+01:00 (WAT)
- Postal code: 802134
- Climate: Aw

Anchuna which is also referred to as Ancuna, Anchina or Anchona, is a populated town in Zangon Kataf Local Government Area in southern Kaduna state in Nigeria. The Bakulu people who speak Ikulu language are the biological occupants of this town. They cannot be identified without the practice of agriculture, traditional spirituality, blacksmithing, animal hunting, and local hairstyles of women. Also, visitors are always welcome for sight seeing. It is the birth place of Late Agwom Yohanna Sidi Kuka, the former head of the Akulu Traditional Council in Anchuna which also happens to be the birth place of the famous Matthew Hassan Kukah, the current Bishop of the Roman Catholic Diocese of Sokoto. One of the main landmarks location in Anchuna is the LGEA Primary School precisely at Unguwar Rimi.

== Settlements ==
The following are the list of hamlets in the town of Anchuna: Akoka, Akurjini, Amawa Lisuru, Ampaga, Boto, Burgu, Dankurasa, Digabi, Dinarah, Dutsen Bako, Fadan Ikulu, Gida Ali, Jirayi, Kachia, Kwarkwano, Lisuri Gida, Lisuru Daji, Makama, Nauta, Sabon Kaura Akupal, Sabon Kaura Fadan Ikulu, Sani, Sarki, Toro Ali, Toro Gida, Ungwan Dodo, Ungwan Fulani, Ungwan Gauta, Ungwan Gimba, Ungwan Goska, Ungwan Pate, Ungwan Rana Lisuru, Ungwan Nauta, Ungwan Rimi (Gidol), Ungwan Wakili Surubu, and Ungwan Yawa.

== Notable people ==
- Late Yohanna Sidi Kuka, former Agwom of Ikulu Traditional Council
- Matthew Hassan Kukah, current Bishop of the Roman Catholic Diocese of Sokoto
