= Edward Lawton =

Edward Lawton may refer to:

- Edward Lawton (Deadshot), a character in the Deadshot comic series
- Edward Thaddeus Lawton (1913–1996), bishop of the Catholic Church
