= 2015 Zaria massacre =

Massacre by Nigerian Army against Shias

- Location of Zaria in Nigeria
- Location: 11°04′N 7°42′E; Zaria, Kaduna State, Nigeria
- Date: 12–14 December 2015
- Target: Shia community, Islamic Movement of Nigeria
- Deaths: At least 1000+
- Perpetrator: Nigerian Army

The Zaria massacre, also known as the Buhari massacre, was a massacre carried out by the Nigerian Army in Zaria, Kaduna State, Nigeria, on Saturday, 12 December 2015, against Shia Muslims, mostly members of the Islamic Movement in Nigeria (IMN). At least 1000 civilians were killed, with 347 bodies secretly buried by the Army in a mass grave.

The Army claimed that it had responded to an attempt to assassinate Nigeria's Chief of Army Staff, Tukur Buratai, by the IMN. This claim has been strongly rejected by the IMN and several human rights organizations who argue that the massacre occurred without any provocation and that all the protestors were unarmed. The incident is considered among the "notable human rights violations since the return to democracy" in Nigeria.

== Incident ==
The Nigerian Army in Zaria, Kaduna State, Nigeria carried out an assault against Shia Muslims, mostly members of the IMN, from 12 December to 14 December 2015. The attack left at least 348 civilians killed and some others injured. Ibrahim Zakzaky, the leader of the IMN, was injured in the incident and was captured along with his wife and hundreds of other members.

Army spokesman Col. Sani Usman claimed that, on 12 December, IMN members had attempted to assassinate General Tukur Burutai while he was driving through Zaria by blocking a stretch of road near their headquarters and throwing stones alongside a petrol bomb at his convoy. IMN members have denied this. Subsequent killings on 13 December around parts of Zakzaky's compound were covered up.

Some of the injured within a makeshift hospital were burned alive, according to a report by Amnesty International. According to a Human Rights Watch report, Nigeria's government buried the bodies without family members' permission.

== Reactions ==
Peaceful protests condemning the killings were held in cities across India, including Mumbai, Chennai, and Hyderabad. Demonstrations were also held in Tehran and Mashhad in Iran.

=== International ===
- The United States of America expressed concern over the killings; stating, "While many details of the incidents...remain unclear, we are dismayed to learn of multiple civilian deaths". The US also called for the Government of Nigeria to "quickly, credibly and transparently investigate" the events.

== Investigation ==
In January 2016, the Kaduna State Government formed the Commission for Judicial Inquiry into the causes of clashes in Zaria between the IMN and the Army in December 2015, under the chairmanship of Justice Mohammed Garba, the presiding justice of the Port Harcourt Division of the Court of Appeal.

The IMN refused to provide evidence to the commission in protest of Zakzaky's continued imprisonment.

=== Findings ===
On 1 August 2016, the commission of inquiry came to the conclusion that Zakzaky should be held responsible, due to "refusing to call his members to order when required to do so."

== See also ==
- Islamic Movement (Nigeria)
- Ibrahim Zakzaky
- Zaria Quds Day massacres
- Shia Islam in Nigeria
- Anti-Shi'ism
- 2015-2016 Killing of Biafran Protesters
