= Kevin Joseph Aje =

Nigerian Catholic prelate (1934–2019)

- Bishop of Sokoto
- Church: Catholic Church
- Diocese: Diocese of Sokoto
- In office: 3 December 1984 – 10 June 2011
- Predecessor: Michael James Dempsey
- Successor: Matthew Hassan Kukah
- Previous post: Coadjutor Bishop of Sokoto (1982-1984)

Orders
- Ordination: 12 June 1966 by John J. Reddington
- Consecration: 6 January 1983 by Pope John Paul II

Personal details
- Born: 25 April 1934 Amper (northwest of Langtang), Northern Region, Colony and Protectorate of Nigeria, British Empire
- Died: 27 May 2019 (aged 85) Sokoto, Sokoto State, Nigeria

Kevin Joseph Aje (25 April 1934 – 27 May 2019) was a Nigerian Catholic prelate, who served as the bishop of the Catholic Diocese of Sokoto, Nigeria, from 1985 to 2011.

== Early life and education ==
Kevin Joseph Aje was born on 25 April 1934 in Amper District in Pankshin Division (now Kanke Local Government Area of Plateau state). Aje received his elementary education in Amper, Pankshin, Kwa, and Shendam respectively. He then trained as a local teacher and taught for a year before proceeding to study for the Catholic priesthood. Aje studied for his Secondary School Certificate in St. Theresa's Minor Seminary, Oke-Are, Ibadan.

== Priesthood ==
Aje studied Philosophy and Theology at Saints Peter and Paul Major Seminary, Bodija, Ibadan. On completion of his formation, he was ordained on 12 June 1966 in Jos by Bishop John J. Reddington, SMA for the Diocese of Jos.

As a priest, Aje served as the Education Secretary of the Diocese of Jos, Coordinator of Justice and Peace, and the Diocesan Secretary. In civil society, he served as a member of the Plateau State Education Board and Plateau State Scholarship Board. From 1977 to 1983, he also served as a member of the Plateau State Teachers Service Commission.

== Bishop ==
In 1977, Aje was appointed the Cathedral Administrator of Our Lady of Fatima Catholic Cathedral in Jos. In 1982, he was elected the Coadjutor Bishop of the Diocese of Sokoto. He was ordained to the episcopate by Pope John Paul II on 6 January 1983 in Rome to succeed Bishop Michael James Dempsey OP. He was officially installed as Bishop of the Diocese of Sokoto on 28 April 1985, becoming the third bishop and first native Nigerian bishop of Sokoto. On 11 December 1988 during a Catholic conference in Sokoto, Aje launched a "Mobilaity Programme", encouraging Catholic laypersons to take a more active role in their pursuit of religious salvation.

During Aje's episcopacy, Nigeria regained democracy and elected its first Muslim president. Prior to the Nigerian general election in 2007, Aje and other Christian leaders urged Nigerians to vote "for a president willing to accommodate all shades of religious views against the diverse background and ethnic composition of Africa's biggest nation". Aje encountered difficulties in trying to build new churches in a predominantly Muslim state, but was enthusiastic about Pope John Paul II's desire for the Legion of Christ to make a special effort in Europe to recover the faith that had done so much good elsewhere. Throughout his tenure he appealed without success to the Sokoto and Zamfara state governments for a land grant that would allow the Catholic Church to construct a hospital.

== Retirement ==
Aje served as Bishop of Sokoto for twenty-six years before his retirement in 2011, serving as the Chairman of Christian Association of Nigeria (CAN), Sokoto State Chapter for ten years. On 8 September 2011, Aje was succeeded by Matthew Hassan Kukah.

== Sources ==
- Ojo, Emmanuel O. (2006). Challenges of Sustainable Democracy in Nigeria. Ibadan: J. Archer. OCLC 503298920.
- Ojo, G. J. Afolabi (2004). Catholic laity in Nigeria: yesterday, today, tomorrow. Catholic Laity Council of Nigeria. ISBN 978-978-36992-4-3.
