= 2005 Quran desecration controversy =

2005 Islam-related controversy

The 2005 Quran desecration controversy began when Newsweek's April 30, 2005, issue contained a report asserting that United States prison guards or interrogators had deliberately damaged a copy of the Quran. A week later, The New Yorker reported the words of Pakistani politician Imran Khan: "This is what the U.S. is doing—desecrating the Quran." This incident caused violent unrest in some parts of the Muslim world.

The Newsweek article, parts of which were subsequently retracted, alleged that government sources had confirmed that United States personnel at the Guantanamo Bay detention camp had deliberately damaged a copy of the book by flushing it in a toilet in order to torment the prison's Muslim captives.

The Newsweek article stated that an official had seen a preliminary copy of an unreleased U.S. government report confirming the deliberate damage. Later on, the magazine retracted this when the (still) unnamed official changed his story. A Pentagon investigation uncovered at least five cases of Quran mishandling by U.S. personnel at the base, but insisted that none of these were acts of desecration. The Pentagon's report also accused a prisoner of damaging a copy of the Quran by putting it in a toilet. In 2007, the American Civil Liberties Union, suing under the Freedom of Information Act, secured the release of a 2002 FBI report containing a detainee's accusation of ill-treatment, including throwing a Quran into a toilet. This specific accusation had been made on several occasions by other Guantanamo detainees since 2002; Newsweek's initial account of a government report confirming it sparked protests throughout the Islamic world and riots in Afghanistan, where pre-planned demonstrations turned deadly. A worldwide controversy followed.

The Newsweek affair turned the spotlight on earlier media reports of such incidents. Accusations of Quran desecration as a part of U.S. interrogations at prisons in Afghanistan and Iraq as well as Guantánamo Bay had been made by a number of sources going back to 2002.

== History ==
There were over a dozen pre-Newsweek reports in the mainstream media alleging U.S. Quran abuse, including the following:

- Several times in 2002 and in early 2003, the International Committee of the Red Cross reported complaints by detainees at Guantanamo Bay prison of desecration of the Quran by U.S. guards in Guantanamo.
- In 2003, an Afghan former prisoner told The Washington Post that U.S. soldiers tormented him by throwing the Quran in the toilet.
- It was reported on 27 October 2004 that four British former detainees alleged that guards threw Korans into toilets.
- The BBC reported on December 30, 2004, that the former Guantánamo prisoner Abdullah Tabarak Ahmad maintained that "American soldiers used to tear up copies of the Quran and throw them in the toilet."
- In a book review dated January 16, 2005, the Hartford Courant reported that five British detainees, after their release, claimed that they "had seen other prisoners sexually humiliated, had been hooded, and were forced to watch copies of the Koran being flushed down toilets."
- The Philadelphia Inquirer reported on January 20, 2005, that there were complaints concerning guards who had "defaced their copies of the Koran and, in one case, had thrown it in a toilet."
- The Miami Herald reported on March 6, 2005, that three Guantánamo captives — Fawzi al Odah, 27, Fouad al Rabiah, 45, and Khalid al Mutairi, 29 — "separately complained to their lawyer that military police threw their Quran into the toilet."
- The Miami Herald also reported on March 9, 2005, that Guantánamo Base staff insulted Allah and "threw Qurans into toilets".

== The Newsweek report ==
On April 30, 2005, Newsweek magazine published an article claiming that an unnamed United States official had seen a government report supporting a "previously unreported" charge. Among the previously unreported cases that sources reportedly told Newsweek: interrogators, in an attempt to rattle suspects, flushed a Quran down a toilet and led a detainee around with a collar and dog leash. The prospect that U.S. personnel may have deliberately defaced the Quran provoked massive anti-U.S. demonstrations throughout the Islamic world, with at least 17 deaths during riots in Afghanistan.

The Newsweek article, by reporter Michael Isikoff, was one of over a dozen such reports of similar incidents that had surfaced in prior months in the U.S. and UK media, but the first involving a U.S. government source acknowledging an inquiry into the event. The Isikoff article was later retracted by Newsweek, which nonetheless defended both its reporter and the story, stating "neither we nor the Pentagon had any idea it would lead to deadly riots." The case turned the spotlight on other reports of desecration of the Quran at Guantánamo.

The article went largely unnoticed for five days. On May 6, Pakistani politician, Imran Khan, held a press conference. Khan criticized his country's government, saying, "This war on terrorism is self-defeating if, on the one hand, you [Musharraf] are demanding that we help them and on the other hand, they are desecrating the book on which our entire faith is based." Khan's press conference was rebroadcast throughout the Muslim world.

The Newsweek report cited an anonymous source, said to be a senior government official, who claimed to have seen a confidential investigative report documenting the alleged incident — in which interrogators, "in an attempt to rattle suspects, reportedly flushed a Quran down a toilet." However, on May 16, Newsweek retracted the statement that the abuse had been uncovered by an "internal military investigation." after the source of the story was later unable to confirm where he had seen the information. In its May 23 issue, Newsweek stated that

Our original source later said he couldn't be certain about reading of the alleged Quran incident in the report we cited, and said it might have been in other investigative documents or drafts. Top administration officials have promised to continue looking into the charges, and so will we. But we regret that we got any part of our story wrong, and extend our sympathies to victims of the violence and to the U.S. soldiers caught in its midst.

The New York Times quoted Isikoff as saying:

Neither Newsweek nor the Pentagon foresaw that a reference to the desecration of the Quran was going to create the kind of response that it did. The Pentagon saw the item before it ran, and then they didn't move us off it for 11 days afterward. They were as caught off guard by the furor as we were. We obviously blame ourselves for not understanding the potential ramifications.

== International reaction ==
On May 10 and continuing the following week, many anti-American protests took place. In Afghanistan, demonstrations that began in the eastern provinces and spread to Kabul were reported to have caused at least seventeen deaths. The United Nations, as a precautionary measure, withdrew all its foreign staff from Jalalabad, where two of its guest houses were attacked, government buildings and shops were targeted, and the offices of two international aid groups were destroyed. Demonstrations also took place in Palestine, Egypt, Sudan, Pakistan and Indonesia, leading to the death of at least 15 people.

White House press secretary Scott McClellan said, "The report had real consequences, people have lost their lives. Our image abroad has been damaged." However, in a press release issued by the United States Department of State on May 12, General Richard Myers claimed that the Newsweek story was not a chief cause of the riots: "He has been told that the Jalalabad, Afghanistan, rioting was related more to the ongoing political reconciliation process in Afghanistan than anything else."

On May 27, thousands of demonstrators gathered in what The New York Times referred to as "waves of protest" in Pakistan, Egypt, Indonesia, Bangladesh, and the Middle East, "mostly centered on Friday prayer gatherings". The New York Times reported that U.S. flags were burned at some demonstrations, and that, although most of the protests were peaceful, overt calls for an "Islamic revolution" were loudly supported by the crowds in Pakistan, further complicating a difficult political situation for General Musharraf.

A Red Cross spokesperson Simon Schorno confirmed that U.S. personnel at Camp X-Ray had displayed "disrespect" to the Quran, and that U.S. officials knew of this activity. Delegates from the International Committee of the Red Cross informed U.S. authorities, who took action to stop the alleged abuse, said Schorno. He declined to specify the nature of the incidents.

"We're basically referring in general terms to disrespect of the Quran, and that's where we leave it", Schorno told The Associated Press. "We believe that since, U.S. authorities have taken the corrective measures that we required in our interventions."

The cousin of Shehzad Tanweer, who participated in the 7 July 2005 London bombings, claimed that Tanweer's ideology was reinforced by allegations of Quran abuse, "incidents like desecration of the Koran" had "always been in his mind."

== Other news reports ==
- The New York Times reported on May 1, 2005, that "[Mr. al-Mutairi] said ... a protest of guards' handling of copies of the Quran, which had been tossed into a pile and stepped on, a senior officer delivered an apology over the camp's loudspeaker system, pledging that such abuses would stop."
- Former Guantánamo Bay detainee Moazzam Begg gave an interview in 2005 in which he claimed to have witnessed "incidents that provoked fury, including the placing of Qurans in an area used as a latrine."
- Six former Guantánamo detainees told the Associated Press that they had seen Koran desecration while in custody at the facility. Two of them claimed to have been abused by having their interrogators throw Korans into buckets of urine. Another claimed that during his interrogation a US soldier threw his Koran in "a bucket of feces".
- Multiple detainees claimed to have seen guards urinating on the Koran as well as seeing them tear it up and throw pages into dirty water.

== U.S. military findings ==
On June 3, 2005, a U.S. military investigation by the base commander, Brigadier General Jay Hood, reported four (possibly five) incidents of "mishandling" of the Quran by U.S. personnel at Guantánamo Bay. Hood said his investigation "revealed a consistent, documented policy of respectful handling of the Quran dating back almost two and a half years."

CBC News reported:

The U.S. Pentagon confirmed Friday a list of abuses involving the Qur'an, Islam's holy book, by American personnel at Guantanamo Bay, but said the incidents were relatively minor.

According to the Hood report:

- a soldier intentionally kicked a Quran;
- an interrogator intentionally stepped on a Quran;
- a guard's urine came through an air vent, unintentionally splashing a detainee and his Quran;
- water balloons thrown by prison guards at one another unintentionally caused a number of Qurans to get wet; and
- a two-word obscenity was written in English on the inside cover of a Quran (whether US personnel were responsible for this act, however, could not be confirmed).

The report laid out the circumstances of these incidents and disciplinary actions taken. It also stressed that such mishandling was rare, and that guards were usually respectful of the Quran, following strict regulations the military laid down for handling the Quran. (The Quran handling policy was codified in a policy letter in January 2003 in response to reports by the Red Cross of Quran abuse.)

The Hood report also listed 15 reported incidents of detainees mishandling their own copies of the Quran, including complaints made by other detainees. One of these cases involved a prisoner "attempting to flush a Quran down the toilet and urinating on the Quran."

The statement did not provide any explanation about why the detainees might have abused their own holy books.

== FBI documents and other reports ==
The Newsweek article and the ensuing controversy turned the spotlight on other reports of Quran desecration and spurred additional investigations by others. After a verdict by a federal court on May 25, 2005, the American Civil Liberties Union (ACLU) obtained documents from the FBI interrogations of Guantánamo Bay detainees dating back to August 2002. The documents stated that some detainees had claimed to have witnessed Quran desecration (including "flush[ing] a Quran in the toilet"), among other acts, on many occasions by their guards — in a document dated August 1, 2002. The pertinent excerpt reads as follows:

[P]rior to his capture, [name redacted] had no information against the United States. Personally, he has nothing against the United States. The guards in the detention facility do not treat him well. Their behavior is bad. About five months ago, the guards beat the detainees. They flushed a Koran in the toilet. The guards dance around when the detainees are trying to pray. The guards still do these things.

The ruling of the court forcing the release of this and other documents came under the Freedom of Information Act.

The ACLU Executive Director Anthony Romero said, in a news release, that "The United States government continues to turn a blind eye to mounting evidence of widespread abuse of detainees held in its custody."

The FBI declared that it could not investigate the matter, as it was up to the Defense Department to do so. For its part, the Pentagon, through its spokesman Lawrence Di Rita, appeared to have transitioned from flat denials to vagueness and unsettled syntax: "There have been instances, and we'll have more to say about it as we learn more, but where a Quran may have fallen to the floor in the course of searching a cell." Scott McClellan, the White House press secretary, told reporters that "past accusations have had credibility issues."

James Jaffer, an attorney working for the ACLU, was quoted by the New York Times as stating that errors in the Newsweek story had been used to discredit other investigative efforts conducted by his organization and other groups "that were not based on anonymous sources, but [on] government documents, reports written by FBI agents."

== The SERE connection ==
Several reports have alleged a connection between events at Guantanamo Bay and a Department of Defense program "Survival, Evasion, Resistance and Escape" (SERE).

On May 16, 2005, Juan Cole published an email from a former SERE attendee who reported abuse of the Christian holy book in training. The emailer had no direct knowledge of operations at Guantanamo, but noted that this tactic sounded similar to that alleged in the Newsweek story.

In July 2005, an article in The New Yorker magazine suggested that the SERE program involved a number of techniques which paralleled those allegedly used at Guantánamo Bay, including the desecration of religious texts. The writer contacted Juan Cole's anonymous source who said that in 1999 he attended a Navy SERE program in California.

So, the Bible trashing happened when this guy had us all in the courtyard sitting for one of his speeches. They were tempting us with a big pot of soup that was boiling – we were all starving from a few days of chow deprivation. He brought out the Bible and started going off on it verbally – how it was worthless, we were forsaken by God, etc. Then he threw it on the ground and kicked it around. It was definitely the climax of his speech. Then he kicked over the soup pot and threw us back in the cells.

The SERE program's chief psychologist, Col. Morgan Banks, issued guidance in early 2003 for "behavioral science consultants" who helped to devise Guantánamo's interrogation strategy—although Banks has emphatically denied that he advocated the use of SERE counter-resistance techniques to break down detainees. However, General James T. Hill, chief of the U.S. Southern Command, confirmed that a team from Guantanamo went "up to our SERE school and developed a list of techniques" for "high-profile, high-value" detainees. According to an op-ed in the November 14, 2005 The New York Times by M. Gregg Bloche and Jonathan H. Marks, two lawyers with no first-hand knowledge of SERE, "General Hill had sent this list – which included prolonged isolation and sleep deprivation, stress positions, physical assault and the exploitation of detainees' phobias – to Secretary of Defense Donald Rumsfeld, who approved most of the tactics in December 2002. Some within the Pentagon warned that these tactics constituted torture, but a top adviser to Secretary Rumsfeld justified them by pointing to their use in SERE training, a senior Pentagon official told us last month."

== See also ==
- Christianah Oluwatoyin Oluwasesin
- Creighton Lovelace
- Dove World Outreach Center Quran-burning controversy
- Guantanamo Bay detention camp
- Qur'an Desecration Report
