= Anti-Shi'ism =

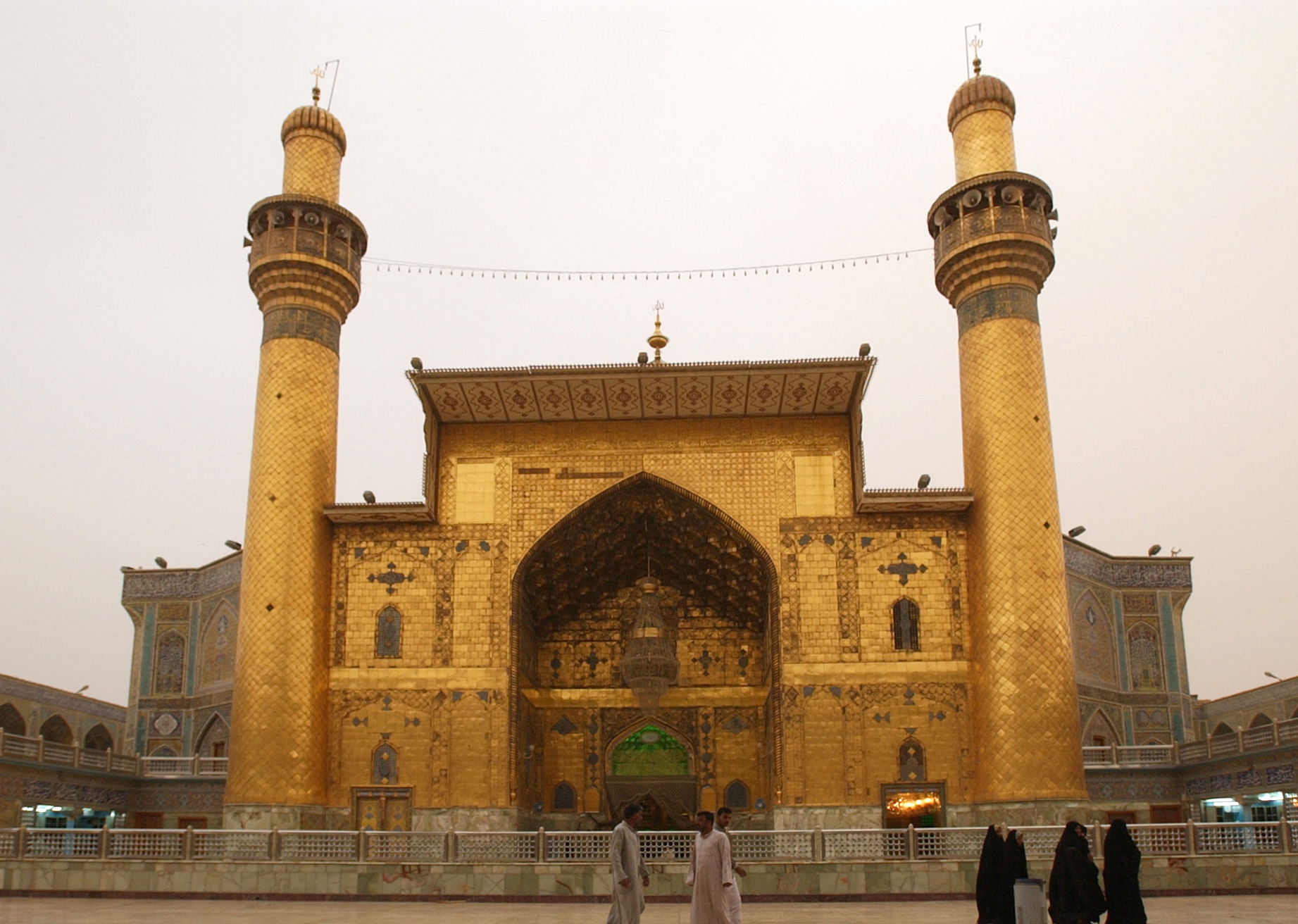
Imam Ali's Shrine in Najaf, Iraq, is one of the holiest sites in Shia Islam.

Anti-Shi'ism, also known as Shiaphobia, is hatred, prejudice, discrimination, persecution, or violence against Shia Muslims due to their religious beliefs, traditions, or cultural heritage. The term was first used by Shia Rights Watch in 2011, but it has been used in informal research and written in scholarly articles for decades.

The dispute over who was the rightful successor to Muhammad resulted in the formation of two main branches, the Sunni, and the Shia. The Sunni, or the "followers of the way", followed the caliphate and maintained the premise that any member of the Quraysh tribe could potentially become the successor to Muhammad if he was accepted by the majority of Muslims. The Shia instead consider the Ahl al-Bayt (household of Muhammad) and maintain the view that only God can decide who His hujjah (proof) can be. This is due to many reasons, including every successor to a prophet being chosen by God from Adam all the way to Muhammad. This includes leaders (Qur'an 5:12), Prophets, messengers, Imams (Qur'an 2:124) and righteous woman (Qur'an 3:42). It is believed that Ali ibn Abi Talib was chosen by God through Muhammad (Hadith of the pond of Khumm) which is also known as Ghadir Khumm where he becomes Muhammad's successor, thus Ali became the religious authority for the Shia people. Militarily established and holding control over the Umayyad government, many Sunni rulers perceived the Shia as a threat – to both their political and religious authority.

The Sunni rulers under the Umayyads sought to marginalize the Shia minority. Throughout the history of Islam, the persecution of Shias by their Sunni co-religionists has often been characterized by brutal and genocidal acts; the most recent case of religious persecution by Sunni Muslim militants involved the genocidal massacre, ethnic cleansing and forced conversion of Shias to Sunni Islam by ISIL in Syria and Iraq (2014–2017). Comprising around 10% of the entire world's Muslim population, to this day, the Shia remain a marginalized community in many Sunni dominated countries and in those countries, they do not have the right to freely practice their religion or establish themselves as an organized denomination.

On the other hand, Sunni and Shia Muslims have lived together in peace over the years. In many countries, they have prayed in the same mosques, while having distinct rituals. Shia identitarianism was based on victimhood narrative of alleged intolerance from mainstream Sunnis who historically questioned their loyalty and Islamic credentials as well as over verdicts of Takfir from hardline Sunnis who denounces all Shias as apostates.

== Historic persecution ==
=== Ghaznavids and Seljuks ===
In 1029 Mahmud of Ghazni conducted a brutal campaign against the city of Rayy. As a stauch Sunni orthodox, he crucified a large number of Ismailis together with Mazdakites and burned many Shi'ite books whose teachings he considered heretical. The poet Farrukhi Sistani wrote two related qasida poems, in which he depicted Rayy as a worthy target for a ghazi raid and those who disobey God to be infidels or heretic (kafirs, babd-madhhabi). During the rule of the Seljuks, large numbers of Ismailis are thought to have converted in hopes of evading persecution.

=== Siege of Baghdad ===
After the Mongol sack of Baghdad in 1258, prejudice against Shias became more frequent, reminiscent of blaming Shias for every problem. One statement states that a Shia minister had betrayed the empire by exposing their weaknesses to the Mongols.

=== Persecution in the Ottoman Empire ===
In response to the support of Alevis and Alawites to the Shia Safavid empire, who were converting the Sunni Iran to Shia along with cursing the first three Rashidun caliphs and burning the tombs of Sunni saints, the Ottoman Empire persecuted Alevis in Anatolia. Tens of thousands of Alevis were killed in Turkey. Alawites in Syria were also subject to persecution.

=== Sack of Shamakhi ===
The Sack of Shamakhi took place on 18 August 1721, when 15,000 Sunni Lezgins, of the Safavid Empire, attacked the capital of Shirvan province, Shamakhi (in present-day Azerbaijan Republic), massacred between 4,000 and 5,000 of its Shia population and ransacked the city.

=== Wahhabi sack of Karbala ===
On 21 April 1802, about 12,000 Wahhabi Sunnis under the command of Abdul-Aziz bin Muhammad, the second ruler of the First Saudi State attacked and sacked Karbala, killed between 2,000 and 5,000 inhabitants and plundered the tomb of Husayn ibn Ali, grandson of Muhammad and son of Ali ibn Abi Talib, and destroyed its dome, seizing a large quantity of spoils, including gold, Persian carpets, money, pearls, and guns that had accumulated in the tomb, most of them donations. The attack lasted for eight hours, after which the Wahhabis left the city with more than 4,000 camels carrying their plunder.

=== Indian subcontinent ===
While Shias and Sunnis have lived side by side in the subcontinent for almost fifteen centuries, anti-Shia violence has been growing consistently for the past three centuries. Anti-Shi'ism has two aspects: shiaphobic literature and hate-crimes. The anti Shia literature that portrays Shias as religiously heretic, morally corrupt, politically traitors and lesser human beings sets the ideological framework for the violence against them. In the medieval period, the Middle East saw bloody clashes between both sects but the Indian subcontinent remained safe and peaceful because of the secular policy of Mughals. Until the end of the seventeenth century AD, only two anti-Shia books were written in India: Minhaj al-Din by Makhdoom-ul Mulk Mullah Abdullah Sultanpuri and Radd-e Rawafiz by Shaikh Ahmad Sirhindi. Sirhindi also wrote this treatise in order to justify the slaughter of Shias by Abdullah Khan Uzbek in Mashhad. In this he argues:

Since the Shia permit cursing Abu Bakr, Umar, Uthman and one of the chaste wives (of the Prophet), which in itself constitutes infidelity, it is incumbent upon the Muslim ruler, nay upon all people, in compliance with the command of the Omniscient King (Allah), to kill them and to oppress them in order to elevate the true religion. It is permissible to destroy their buildings and to seize their property and belongings.

As far as armed violence is concerned, the medieval period has only few examples of Shias being killed for their beliefs, most notable incidents are the killing of Abdullah Shah Ghazi in 769 AD, the destruction of Multan in 1005 AD, the persecution of Shias at the hands of Sultan Feroz Shah (1351–1388 AD), and the target killing of Mullah Ahmad Thattvi in 1589 AD. However, the killer of Mulla Ahmad Thathavi was served justice by Emperor Akbar. The death of Syed Nurullah Shushtari seems to be politically motivated as Emperor Jahangir disliked his father who did not consider him suitable for the throne, and persecuted men of his court, as an eighteenth century editor of Jahangirnama puts it, "the new sovereign possibly wished to draw a line under the rule of his father and all those associated needed to be sidelined". The region of Srinagar in Kashmir is an exception in Middle Ages with ten bloody Taraaj-e Shia campaigns. Shias faced severe persecution in India in Kashmir for centuries, by the Sunni invaders of the region which resulted in the killing of many Shias and as a result most of them had to flee the region. Plunder, looting and killing virtually devastated the community. History records 10 such Taraajs between 15th to 19th century in 1548, 1585, 1635, 1686, 1719, 1741, 1762, 1801, 1830, and 1872, during which the Shia habitations were plundered, people killed, libraries burnt and their sacred sites desecrated. The community, due to their difficulties, went into the practice of Taqya in order to preserve their lives.

However, in the eighteenth century AD, the number of polemical writings started to increase. It started with Aurangzeb's discrimination against the Shias. The sixth Mughal emperor Aurangzeb Alamgir hated the Shias; he abolished the secular policy of Akbar and tried to establish the superiority of the Sunni sect. He supervised the compilation of an encyclopaedia of religious rulings, called fatawa Alamgiri, in which Shias were said to be heretics. The spiritual leader of Bohra Shias, Sayyid Qutb-ud-din, along with his 700 followers were massacred on the orders of Aurangzeb. He banned the tazia processions. In the century following his death, polemical literature and sectarian killings increased.

Aurengzeb heavily persecuted many Shi‘a communities. ‘Ali Muhammad Khan, whose father accompanied Aurengzeb during his Deccan campaigns, reports:

During the reign of the late emperor, tremendous emphasis was placed on matters of the shari‘a and on refuting various [non-Sunni] schools of thought. No efforts were spared in this regard. Many people thus emerged who maintained that, for God's sake, their very salvation lay in this. Because of religious bigotry, which is the bane of humankind, they placed a group under suspicion of Shi‘ism (rafḍ), thus destroying the very ramparts of the castle of their existence [i.e., having them killed], while others were thrown into prison.

Shah Waliullah (1703–1762 AD) was among those Sunni clerics who were patronized by the Sunni elite. He started his career by translating the anti-Shia track of Shaikh Ahmad Sirhindi, radd-e-rawafiz, into Arabic under the title of al-muqaddima tus-saniyyah fil intisar lil-firqa te-sunniya (المقدمۃ الثانیہ فی الانتصار للفرقۃ السنیہ). He continued to criticise the Shias in his books like Qurat-ul Ainain (قراۃ العینین), Azalah-tul Khafa (ازالۃ الخفا), Fayyuz-ul Haramain (فیوض الحرمین), etc. Other Sunni polemics include Najat al-Muminin (نجات المومنین) by Muhammad Mohsin Kashmiri, and Durr-ut Tahqiq (درالتحقیق) by Muhammad Fakhir Allahabadi. In a letter to Sunni nawabs, Shah Waliullah said:

Strict orders should be issued in all Islamic towns forbidding religious ceremonies publicly practised by Hindus such as the performance of Holi and ritual bathing in the Ganges. On the tenth of Muharram, the Shias should not be allowed to go beyond the bounds of moderation, neither should they be rude nor repeat stupid things in the streets or bazars.

When on his and Rohilla's invitation, Ahmad Shah Abdali Durrani conquered Delhi, he expelled Shias. Shias of Kashmir were also massacred in an organised campaign after Afghans took power. In Multan, under the Durrani rule, Shia were not allowed to practise their religion.

Shah Waliullah's eldest son, Shah Abd al-Aziz (1746–1823 AD), hated Shias the most. He compiled most of the anti-Shia books available to him, albeit in his own language and after adding his own ideas, in a single book Tuhfa Asna Ashariya (تحفہ اثنا عشریہ ). Although he did not declare them apostates or non-Muslims, but he considered them lesser human beings just like what he would think about Hindus or other non-Muslims. In a letter he advises Sunnis to not greet Shias first, and if a Shia greets them first, their response should be cold. In his view, Sunnis should not marry Shias, avoid eating their food and the animals slaughtered by a Shia.

Syed Ahmad Barelvi and Shah Ismail Dehlvi took up arms to enforce their puritanical views and migrated to Peshawar region to establish an Islamic Caliphate. They were the pioneers of anti-Shia terrorism in the subcontinent. Barbara Metcalf says:

"A second group of Abuses Syed Ahmad held were those that originated from Shi’i influence. He particularly urged Muslims to give up the keeping of ta’ziyahs. The replicas of the tombs of the martyrs of Karbala taken in procession during the mourning ceremony of Muharram. Muhammad Isma’il wrote,

'a true believer should regard the breaking of a tazia by force to be as virtuous an action as destroying idols. If he cannot break them himself, let him order others to do so. If this even be out of his power, let him at least detest and abhor them with his whole heart and soul'.

Sayyid Ahmad himself is said, no doubt with considerable exaggeration, to have torn down thousands of imambaras, the building that house the taziyahs".

These attacks were carried out between 1818 and 1820. Rizvi has given more details about time, places and circumstances in which these attacks were carried out.

With the start of direct Crown control after 1857, religious institutions and scholars lost most of the financial support they enjoyed previously. They now had to rely on public funding, the chanda. Secondly, when the colonial government decided to introduce modern societal reforms, and everybody became ascribed to a singular identity in census and politically importance in voting. Thus, politicisation of religion and marking boundaries of the spheres of influence became a financial need of the religious leaders. They started to describe everybody belonging to their sect or religion as one monolithic group of people whose religion was in danger. The third important social change was the printing press which made writing and publishing pamphlets and books easy and cheap. The fourth factor was the railways and postal service; it became easy for communal leaders to travel, communicate and build networks beyond their place of residence. This changed the religious discourse drastically and gave birth to communal and sectarian violence. The puritanical wahhabists had already excluded Azadari from the Sunni Islam, and Arya Samaj and Shudhis started to ask Hindus to refrain from Azadari.

By the start of the 1900s, the majority of Sunnis still observed Muharram. Molana Abdul Shakoor Lakhnavi devised a clever plan to widen the gulf between the Shias and Sunnis. He started to advocate a celebration of victory of Imam Hussain over Yazid. He established a separate Sunni Imambargah at Phul Katora and asked Sunnis to wear red or yellow dress instead of black, and carry a decorated charyari flag instead of the traditional black alam-e-Abbas. Instead of honouring the Sahaba on their birthdays, he started to arrange public meetings under the banner of bazm-e-siddiqi, bazm-e-farooqi and bazm-e-usmani, in the first ten days of Muharram to revere the first three Caliphs and named it Madh-e-Sahaba. He would discuss the lives of the first three Caliphs and attack Shia beliefs. Shias saw it an attempt to sabotage the remembrance of the tragedy of Karbala and started to recite tabarra in response.

After the failure of the Khilafat movement in the 1920s, the political ulema had lost their support in public and Muslims started to follow modern minds like Muhammad Ali Jinnah. To keep themselves relevant, the ulema established a militant Deobandi organisation, Majlis Ahrar-e-Islam, in 1931. They came from neighbouring Malihabad, Kanpur, Delhi, Meerut and from as far as Peshawar. This organisation can be considered as predecessor of Sipah-e-Sahaba Pakistan (SSP). They first agitated against the Ahmedis in Kashmir and now they were looking for an opportunity. It was provided by Molana Abdul shakoor Lakhnavi's son Molana Abdul Shakoor Farooqi. He was a graduate of Darul Uloom Deoband and he had established a seminary in Lucknow in 1931 right on the route of Azadari, called Dar-ul-Muballighin. Molana Abdul Shakoor Farooqi wrote many books and pamphlets. Shias responded by writing rejoinders. As paper had become available in plenty, these writings spread all over subcontinent and caused incidents of violence, though negligible compared to what was happening in UP. Dhulipala says:

The problem broke out with renewed vigour in 1936 on Ashura day when two Sunnis disobeyed orders and publicly recited Charyari in the city centre of Lucknow. They were arrested and prosecuted, but then on Chhelum day more Sunnis took part in reciting Charyari and fourteen were arrested. This led to a new agitation by the Lucknow Sunnis in favour of reciting these verses publicly, which came to be known as Madhe Sahaba.

Azadari in UP was no more peaceful; it would never be the same again. Violence went so far that on Ashura 1940, a Deobandi terrorist attacked the Ashura procession with a bomb. Hollister writes:

"Conflicts between Sunnis and Shias at Muharram are not infrequent. Processions in the cities are accompanied by police along fixed lines of march. The following quotations from a single newspaper are not usual. They indicate what might happen if government did not keep the situation under control: ‘adequate measures avert incidents’, ‘Muharram passed off peacefully’, ‘All shops remained closed in ... in order to avoid incidents’, ‘Several women offered satyagraha in front of the final procession ... about twenty miles from Allahabad. They object to the passing of the procession through their fields’, ‘the police took great precautions to prevent a breach of the peace’, ‘as a sequel to the cane charge by the police on a Mehndi procession the Moslems ... did not celebrate the Muharram today. No ta’zia processions were taken out ... Business was transacted as usual in the Hindu localities’, ‘Bomb thrown on procession’. Not all of these disturbances spring from sectarian differences, but those differences actuate many fracases. Birdwood says that, in Bombay, where the first four days of Muharram are likely to be devoted to visiting each other's tabut khanas, women and children as well as men are admitted, and members of other communities – only the Sunnies are denied ‘simply as a police precaution".

=== China ===
Most foreign slaves in Xinjiang were Shia Ismaili Mountain Tajiks of China. They were referred to by Sunni Turkic Muslims as Ghalcha, and enslaved because they were different from the Sunni Turkic inhabitants. Shia Muslims were sold as slaves in Khotan. The Muslims of Xinjiang traded Shias as slaves.

The Sunni Muslim cleric Yusuf Ma Dexin who had traveled throughout the Ottoman Empire, picked up anti-Shia views and after returning to his homeland Yunnan, staunchly preached against Shiism and Sufism, including while he was supporting the Panthay rebellion. He described Iran as a Shia country and used the derogatory term Rafidah for Shia Muslims and also criticized Sufi orders among the Hui as like Rafidah, calling for them to be abolished. This rhetoric was partly due to the growing marginalization of the Hui Muslims within China and calls for unity and defense against the increasing dominance of Han society.

== Modern times ==
=== Afghanistan ===
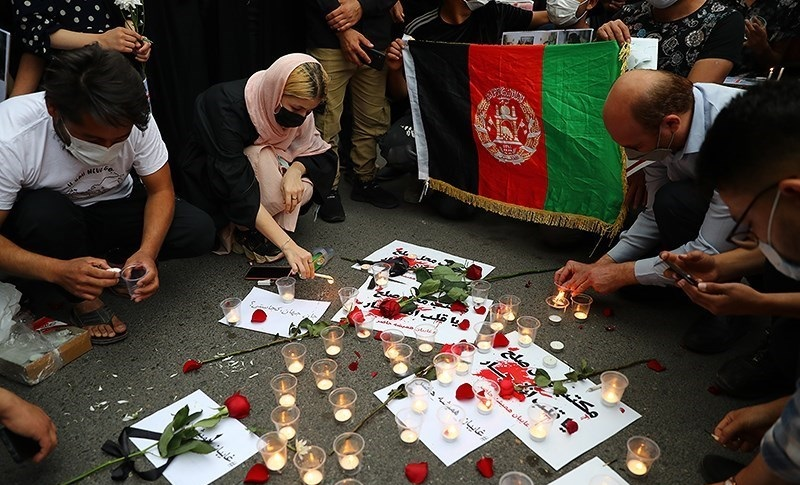
Civilians laying flowers in memory of the victims of the 2021 Kabul school bombing, a sectarian attack targeting Shi'a Hazara schoolgirls.

=== Bangladesh ===
On 24 October 2015 a bomb exploded at a Shia mosque, resulting in one person dead and many more injured. Another deadly attack took place at Haripur in Shibganj, in Bogra. The Muezzin was shot dead at a Shiite mosque, and at least four other men, including the imam, were injured.

=== Bahrain ===
A sizeable minority of Bahrain's population are Shia, with around 42% of the population. They were previously the majority, accounting for about 50–70%. However, due to increased naturalization of Sunni migrants, their numbers have decreased significantly, which has altered the country's demographics.

The ruling Al Khalifa family, who are Sunni Muslim, arrived in Bahrain from Qatar at the end of the eighteenth century and persecuted the Shias. The Shias believe that the Al Khalifa failed to gain legitimacy in Bahrain and established a system of "political apartheid based on racial, sectarian, and tribal discrimination." Often, Shias are declared non-Muslims and persecuted. Vali Nasr, a leading Iranian expert on Middle East and Islamic world said "For Shi'ites, Sunni rule has been like living under apartheid".

==== 2011 uprising ====
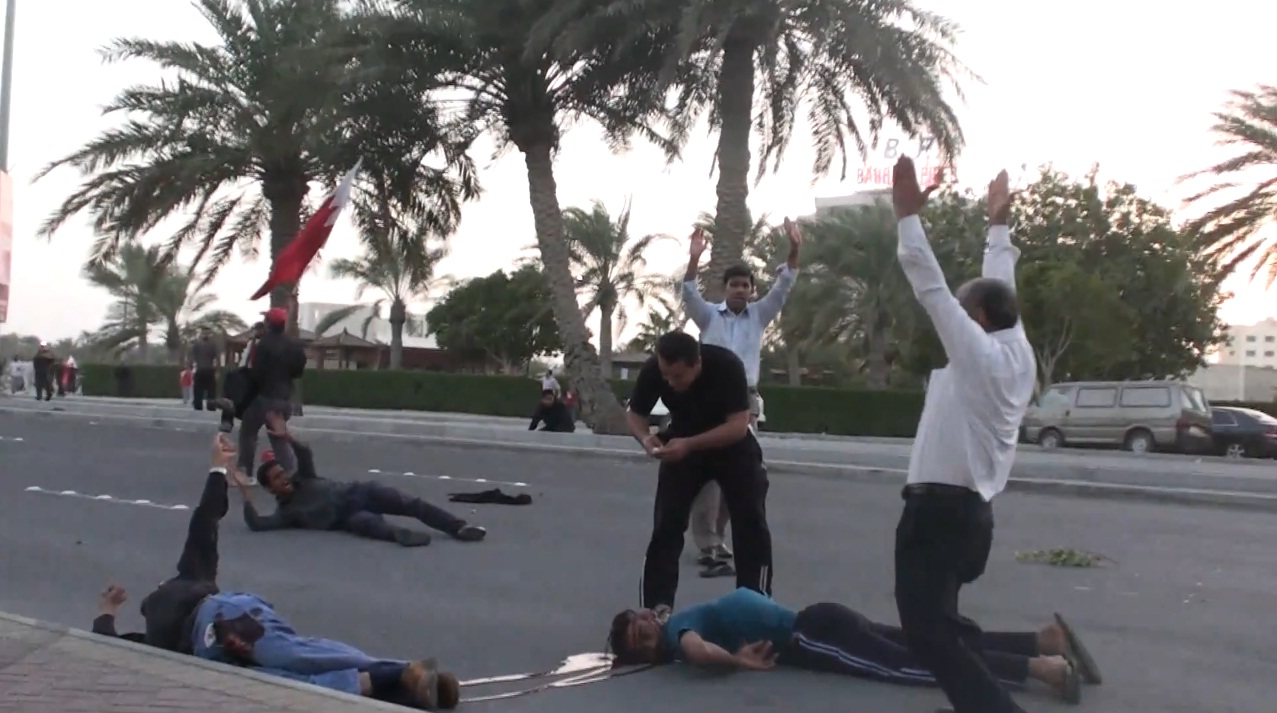
Bahraini protesters shot by military, 2011

Since the 2011 uprising, an estimated 1,000 Bahrainis have been detained and accused of being non-Muslims or heretics. Bahraini and international human rights groups have documented hundreds of cases in which Shia detainees have been tortured and abused. According to csmonitor.org, the government has gone beyond the crushing of political dissent by resorting to what "appears" to be an attempt to "psychologically humiliate the island's Shiite majority into silent submission."

==== Apartheid ====
Discrimination against Shia Muslims in Bahrain is severe and systematic enough for a number of sources (Time magazine, Vali Nasr, Yitzhak Nakash, Bahrain Centre for Human Rights, etc.) to have used the term "apartheid" in their descriptions of it.

Writing in the Daily Mirror, Ameen Izzadeen asserts that

after the dismantling of the apartheid regime in South Africa, Bahrain remained the only country where a minority dictated terms to a majority. More than 70 percent of the Bahrainis are Shiite Muslims, but they have little or no say in the government.

The Christian Science Monitor describes Bahrain as practicing

a form of sectarian apartheid by not allowing Shiites to hold key government posts or serve in the police or military. In fact, the security forces are staffed by Sunnis from Syria, Pakistan, and Baluchistan who also get fast-tracked to Bahraini citizenship, much to the displeasure of the indigenous Shiite population whose members are often considered non Muslims or lesser Muslims because they are Shias.

=== Egypt ===
Shia activists claim that more than one million Shias live in Egypt, while other sources claim that only a few thousand Shias live in Egypt. Estimated numbers of Egypt's Shias range from 800,000 to about two to three million, however, there is no official count.

The Egyptian government began to focus its attention on Shiites during the presidency of Hosni Mubarak in order to build better relations with the Arab states of the Persian Gulf. Shia activists in Egypt have also claimed that when the Muslim Brotherhood was in power in Egypt in 2013, the government espoused anti-Shiism, seeing it as a religious duty, however, some Salafist groups accused the Muslim Brotherhood of not doing enough to stop the spread of Shiism. Another Shiite activist claimed that during Mubarak's presidency, he was arrested, held for 15 months and tortured by the Egyptian State Security Investigations Service.

=== India ===
India is a secular state, and adherents of Shia Islam in India are free to practice their faith freely. Additionally, the day of Ashura, listed as Moharram, and the birthdate of Ali are recognized as public holidays. However Shia Muslims in Kashmir are not allowed to practice mourning on the day of Ashura since 1989. This is primarily to cater to the demands of the Sunnis in Kashmiris who form the vast majority of population and also to resolve the issue of terrorism. The government has placed restrictions over Muharram processions since 1989, and both parties, Jammu & Kashmir National Conference and Jammu and Kashmir Peoples Democratic Party, headed by Sunnis have supported the bans from last three decades. Every year clashes take place between the Kashmiri mourners and Indian forces on the eve of Karbala martyrdom anniversaries.

The city of Lucknow has a history of violence between the Shia and Sunni sects during the Shia mourning month of Muharram, usually due to actions by the Sunnis which are considered offensive to Shias. During Muharram, Sunni clerics organize rituals praising the first three caliphs of Islam (madh-e sahaba), while deliberately excluding Ali, the fourth caliph and these are usually held in front of Shia mosques or as a response to Shia Muharram processions. Members of the Sunni sect are also known to block Shia processions passing through Sunni areas, causing tensions between the two sects. Sunnis have also declared them as non Muslims on various occasions through official fatwas, however they mean little as the Indian government recognises Shias as Muslims.

=== Indonesia ===
On 29 December 2011, in Nangkrenang, Sampang, Madura Island a Shia Islamic boarding school, a school adviser's house and a school's principal house were burned by local villagers and people from outside. Indonesia is the most populous Muslim country in the world which is dominated by Sunnis. A day after the incident, a Jakarta Sunni preacher said: "It was their own fault. They have established a pesantren (Islamic school) in a Sunni area. Besides, being a Shiite is a big mistake. The true teaching is Sunni and God will only accept Sunni Muslims. If the Shiites want to live in peace, they have to repent and convert." Amnesty International had recorded many cases of intimidation and violence against religious minorities in Indonesia by radical Islamic groups and urged the Indonesian government to provide protection for hundreds of Shiites who have been forced to return to their village in East Java.

Additionally, there is also a corresponding anti-Shi'ist organization, National Anti-Shia Alliance (ANNAS), which was founded on 20 April 2014.

=== Malaysia ===
The Malaysian government bans Shias from promoting their faith. Sixteen Shias were arrested on 24 September 2013 for "spreading" their faith.

Shi'ism was a talking point of fear in editorials by newspapers controlled by Malaysia's conservative parties during the 2013 Malaysian general election.

=== Iraq ===
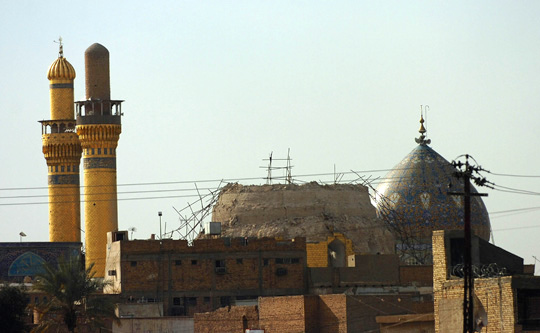
The Al-Askari Mosque, one of the holiest sites in Shia Islam, after the first attack by Sunni affiliated Al-Qaeda in Iraq in 2006

Prior to 2003, the Sunni-Shia dynamics was more of a national difference than a religious one.

Following the 2003 Invasion of Iraq and subsequent fall of Saddam Hussein's regime, the minority Sunni sect, which had previously enjoyed increased benefits under Saddam's rule, now found itself out of power as the Shia majority, suppressed under Saddam, sought to establish power. Such sectarian tensions resulted in a violent insurgency waged by different Sunni and Shia militant groups, such as al-Qaeda in Iraq and the Mahdi Army. Following 2006 tens of thousands of people were killed across Iraq, when a civil war between the two Muslim rival sects erupted after the 2006 al-Askari mosque bombing, lasting until 2008.

After the U.S. withdrawal from Iraq in 2011, Sunnis went out in protests against the Iraqi government and violence increased to 2008 levels, which escalated in 2014 into a renewed war involving the Islamic State of Iraq and the Levant lasting until 2017.

=== Nigeria ===
Members of the Nigerian Shia community have been persecuted in different ways including demolition of Shia mosques, targeted killings and anti-Shia propaganda. Saudi Arabian-linked Sunni politicians, organizations and Nigerian security apparatus are behind the persecution of Shia Muslims in Nigeria. The Salafist movement Izala Society, is close to both Riyadh and Abuja and its satellite television channel Manara often broadcasts anti-Shiite sectarian propaganda.

The state government of Sokoto has reacted to the rise of Shia Islam in the state by taking such measures as demolishing the Islamic Center in 2007. Furthermore, clashes between Sunni and Shia residents followed the assassination of Salafi Imam Umaru Danmaishiyya, who was known for his fiery anti-Shia preaching.

In 2014, the Zaria Quds Day massacres took place, leaving 35 dead. In 2015, the Zaria massacre during which 348 Shia Muslims were killed by the Nigerian Army.

In April 2018, clashes broke out as Nigerian police fired teargas on Shia protesters who were demanding the release of Sheikh Ibrahim Zakzaky, who had been detained for two years with no trial. The clashes left at least one protester dead and several others injured. Further, Nigerian police detained at least 115 protesters.

In October 2018, Nigerian military killed at least 45 peaceful Shia protesters. After soldiers began to fire, they targeted protesters fleeing the chaos. Many of the injured were shot in the back or legs.

On 26 July 2019, A Nigerian court imposed an activities ban on the Shia Islamic Movement because of “acts of terrorism and illegality”. Anietie Ewang, Nigeria researcher at Human Rights Watch declared that “The sweeping court ruling against the Shia movement threatens the basic human rights of all Nigerians.”

=== Pakistan ===
Shia Muslim civilians were victims of unprovoked hate since the beginning of Pakistan. With the "Islamisation" in the 1980s, Pakistan has been seeing a surge in violence against Shia Muslims in the country in recent decades.

Over 1,900 Shias were killed in bomb blasts or targeted gun attacks from 2012 to May 2015 alone.

The violence has claimed lives of thousands of men, women and children. Shia make up 15-20% of the Muslim population in Pakistan. However they are mostly excluded from positions of power. Sunni militants have attacked doctors, businessmen and other professionals in Karachi on a regular basis. It was reported that 8,000 people in Hazara of Quetta were killed. They have been targeted by "terrorist attacks by Lashkar-e-Jhangvi and Sipah-e-Sahaba Pakistan which are a Sunni militant organizations affiliated with Al-Qaeda and Taliban". Such as these attacks on Shia civilians was common in the northern areas of Pakistan, such as Parachinar and Gilgit-Baltistan.

On 16 August 2012, some 25 Shia passengers were pulled out of four buses on Babusar road, when they were going home to celebrate Eid with their families. That was the third attack on Shia in six months. They were summarily executed by Al-Qaeda affiliated Sunni Muslim militants. On the same day, three Hazara community members were shot dead in Pakistan's southwestern town of Quetta. Sunni extremists, aligned with Al-Qaeda and the Taliban, yearly are killing Shia civilians by the hundreds in Pakistan.

The sole purpose of some terrorist groups such as Sipah-e-Sahaba Pakistan is to cleanse Pakistan of Shia Muslims. On 26 June 2018, government of Pakistan lifted ban on Sipah-e-Sahaba Pakistan, unfroze its assets and removed its notorious leader from terrorist watch list.

In September 2020, Pakistan's extremist Sunni Muslim group accused the indigenous Shias of being non-Muslims and heretics who spread fitna. The hashtag "infidel, infidel, Shias are infidel" was trended on campaigns were launching. Thousand of Pakistanis marched for an anti-Shia protests in Karachi, the country's financial hub, during early September 2020. The march was caused due to Shia clergies making disparaging remarks against historical Islamic figures. The remarks were televised during the Shia Ashura procession. Ashura commemorates the Battle of Karbala, which caused the schism in Islam. Sunni groups demanded that disparaging remarks against any Islamic figures were not acceptable and will not be tolerated.

=== Saudi Arabia ===
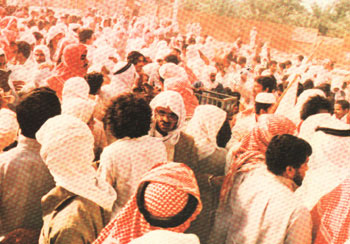
Demonstrators in Safwa City, Qatif during the 1979 Qatif Uprising

In modern-day Saudi Arabia, the Wahhabi rulers limit Shia political participation to a few notable people. These notables benefit from their ties to power and in turn, are expected to control their community. Saudi Shias comprise roughly 10% of the 28 million Saudis (estimate 2012). They have been considered Second-Class Citizens. Although some live in Medina (known as the Nakhawila), Mecca, and even Riyadh, the majority are concentrated in the oases of al-Hasa and Qatif in the oil-rich areas of the Eastern Province. They have faced long-term religious and economic discrimination. They have usually been denounced as heretics, traitors, and non-Muslims. Shias were accused of sabotage, most notably for bombing oil pipelines in 1988. A number of Shias have been executed. In response to Iran's militancy, the Saudi government collectively punished the Shia community in Saudi Arabia by placing restrictions on their freedoms and marginalizing them economically. The ulama (who adhere to Salafism) were given permission to sanction violence against the Shia. What followed were fatwas passed by the country's leading cleric, Abdul-Aziz ibn Baz which denounced the Shias as apostates. Another by Adul-Rahman al-Jibrin, a member of the Higher Council of Ulama even sanctioned the killing of Shias. This call was reiterated in Salafi religious literature as late as 2002.

There are no Shia religious seminaries in Saudi Arabia, so the training of Shia scholars is restricted. Also, the building of the Shia mosques is prohibited in some regions of Saudi Arabia.

Unlike Iraq and Lebanon, which have a sizable number of wealthy Shia, Saudi Arabia does not. There have been no Shia cabinet ministers. They are kept out of critical jobs in the armed forces and the security services. There are no Shia mayors or police chiefs, and none of the three hundred Shia girls’ schools in the Eastern Province have a Shia principal.

The government has restricted the names that Shias can use for their children in an attempt to discourage them from showing their identity. Saudi textbooks are hostile to Shiism often characterizing the faith as a form of heresy. Salafi teachers frequently tell classrooms full of young Shia schoolchildren that they are heretics.

In the city of Dammam, a quarter of whose residents are Shia, Ashura is banned, and there is no distinctly Shia call to prayer. There is no Shia cemetery for the nearly 25% of the 600,000 Shias that live there. There is only one mosque for the city's 150,000 Shias. The Saudi government has often been viewed as an active oppressor of Shias because of the funding of the Wahhabi ideology which denounces the Shia faith.

In March 2011, police opened fire on peaceful protesters in Qatif, and after Shia unrest in October 2011 the Saudi government promised to crush any further trouble in the eastern province with an "iron fist".

Saudi Arabia continues its anti-Shia campaign both domestically and abroad. According to the Independent, "Satellite television, internet, YouTube and Twitter content, frequently emanating from or financed by oil states in the Arabian peninsula, are at the centre of a campaign to spread sectarian hatred to every corner of the Muslim world, including places where Shia are a vulnerable minority, such as Libya, Tunisia, Egypt and Malaysia."

Saudi Arabia's policy towards non-Wahhabi forms of religious expression has been described as religious apartheid. Mohammad Taqi writes that

The Saudi regime is also acutely aware that, in the final analysis, the Shiite grievances are not merely doctrinal issues but stem from socioeconomic deprivation, as a result of religious repression and political marginalization bordering on apartheid.

In January 2016, Saudi Arabia executed the prominent Shiite cleric Sheikh Nimr, who had called for pro-democracy demonstrations, along with 47 other Saudi citizens sentenced by the Specialized Criminal Court on terrorism charges.

Since May 2017 in response to protests against the government, the predominantly Shia town of Al-Awamiyah has been put under full siege by the Saudi military. Residents are not allowed to enter or leave, and the military indiscriminately shells the neighborhoods with airstrikes, mortar fire along with snipers shooting residents. Dozens of Shia civilians were killed, including a three-year-old and two-year-old children. The Saudi government claims it is fighting terrorists in al-Awamiyah. Residents also reported soldiers shooting at homes, cars and everyone in streets. During the crackdown the Saudi government demolished several historical sites and many other buildings and houses in Qatif. On 26 July 2017, Saudi authorities began refusing to give emergency services to wounded civilians. Saudi Arabia has also not provided humanitarian help to trapped citizens of Awamiyah. In August 2017, it was reported that the Saudi government demolished 488 buildings in Awamiyah. This demolition came from a siege of the city by the Saudi government, as it continued to try to prevent the citizens of the city from gaining their rights. 20,000 residents were forced to flee from their homes to survive. President of Quran Council and two cousins of executed Nimr al-Nimr were also killed by Saudi security forces in Qatif in 2017.

Khomeini governed Iran based on Islamic rule. He supported Shia in other countries including Lebanon, Iraq, Afghanistan, Bahrain, and Pakistan to strengthen the Sunni-Shia union. Khomeini's efforts were respected by some Sunni Islamists, such as the Muslim Brotherhood and Hamas who "didn't accept his leadership". After the victory of the Iranian revolution and the establishment of the Shia power in Iran, Saudi Arabia tried to spread Wahhabism globally. The Iraqi military was supported by Saudi Arabia against Iranian Shia from 1980 to 1988.

Two decades ago, extremist groups have gotten financial support from Saudi Arabia and the Gulf states and they were able to speared propaganda and attract recruits by satellite television and high-speed Internet.

=== Syria ===
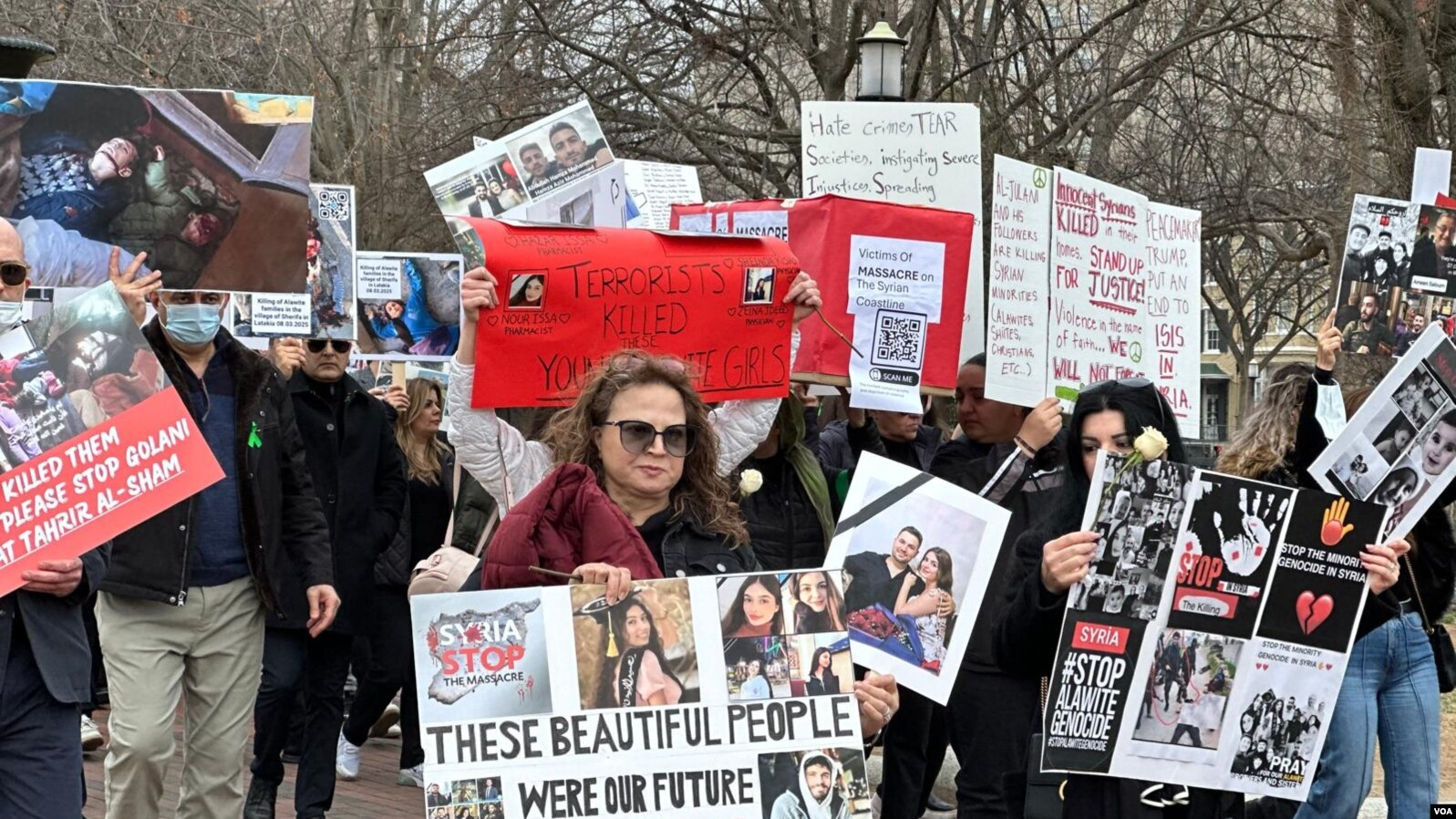
Protest in Washington D.C. against the 2025 massacres of Syrian Alawites

The Alawites make up the population of Syria located in the northwestern coastal part of the country and have practiced Shia Islam. They were faced in the periods of subjugation or persecution under various Muslim empires such as the Ottomans, Abbasids, Mamluks, and others. The establishment of the French Mandate of Syria in 1920 marked a turning point in Alawite history. Until then, the community had commonly self-identified as "Nusayris", emphasizing their connections to Ibn Nusayr. The French administration prescribed the label "Alawite" to categorise the sect alongside Shiism in official documents. The French recruited a large number of minorities into their armed forces and created exclusive areas for minorities, including the Alawite State. Which was later dismantled, but the Alawites continued to play a significant role in the Syrian military and later in the Ba'ath Party.

After Hafez al-Assad's seizure of power during the 1970 coup, the Ba'athist state enforced Assadist ideology amongst Alawites to supplant their traditional identity. During the first phases of the Syrian Civil War, communal tensions were further exacerbated as the country destabilized into a full-scale sectarian civil war, which would culminate in the collapse of the Ba'athist regime by numerous rebel offensives. This has also led to the killings of the Alawite populace who were alleged to have ties with the previous regime during the conflict in parts of Western Syria by Assad loyalists.

=== Yemen ===
Although 35% of Yemenis are Shia, discrimination against Shia has been omnipresent in Yemen. It was mostly practiced by the Sunnis, which made up 65% of Yemeni population. This had led to the rise of Houthi movement and subsequent sectarian conflict in Yemen, sparking the civil war.

== See also ==
- Anti-Alevism
- Anti-Iranian sentiment
- Anti-Sunnism
- Counter-jihad
- Criticism of Islam
- Criticism of Islamism
- Genocide of Christians by the Islamic State
- Genocide of Yazidis by the Islamic State
- Islamophobia
- Iran-Saudi Arabia proxy conflict
- Persecution of minority Muslim groups
  - Persecution of Ahmadis
  - Persecution of Sufis
  - Sectarian violence among Muslims
- Persecution of Muslims

Persecution of Shia Muslims by Sunnis:

- Imam Reza shrine stabbings
- Dujail Massacre
- 1991 Iraqi uprisings
- Persecution of Hazara people
- Persecution of Kashmiri Shias
- Persecution of Shias by the Islamic State
- Salafi movement
  - International propagation of Salafism and Wahhabism
  - Salafi jihadism
- Sunni fatwas on Shias
- Wahhabism
