= Matthew Hassan Kukah =

Nigerian Catholic bishop

The Right Reverend Matthew Hassan Kukah
- Bishop, Roman Catholic Diocese of Sokoto
- Church: Roman Catholic
- Archdiocese: Kaduna
- Metropolis: Kaduna
- Diocese: Sokoto
- Appointed: 10 June 2011
- Predecessor: Bishop Kevin Joseph Aje

Personal details
- Born: Matthew Hassan Kukah; 31 August 1952 (age 73) Anchuna, Northern Region, British Nigeria (now in Kaduna State, Nigeria)
- Denomination: Roman Catholic
- Education: SOAS University of London, 1990 (PhD.); University of Bradford, 1980 (MD); Pontifical Urban University Rome, 1976 (BD)

Matthew Hassan Kukah (born 31 August 1952) is the current bishop of the Roman Catholic Diocese of Sokoto.

In December 2020, Pope Francis appointed him as a member of the Dicastery on Integral Human Development.

== Early life and education ==
Kukah was born on Anchuna, Ikulu chiefdom in the Zangon Kataf local government area of Kaduna State. Kukah received his primary education at St. Fidelis Primary School, Zagom, then St. Joseph Minor Seminary, Zaria, before proceeding to St. Augustine Major Seminary Jos, Plateau State, where he studied Philosophy and Theology. Kukah was ordained a Catholic priest on 19 December 1976. Kukah also attended the University of Ibadan, where he obtained a diploma in religious studies. Kukah also received a bachelor of divinity at the Pontifical Urban University, Rome in 1976, followed by a master's degree in peace studies, at the University of Bradford, United Kingdom in 1980. Kukah's academic pursuits culminated with a PhD from University of London's School of Oriental and African Studies (SOAS) in 1990. At some unspecified point, he studied at the University of Oxford, in Oxford, in Oxfordshire, England, United Kingdom, and also at Harvard University, in Cambridge, Massachusetts, in Greater Boston, in the United States.

Between 1999 and 2001 Kukah served as a member of the Nigerian Investigation Commission of Human Rights Violations. In addition to his work as a parish priest of Saint Andrews's parish in Kakuri, Kaduna from 2004 until his nomination as bishop, he was secretary of the National Political Reform Conference (2005) and from 2005 onwards he has been serving as the chairman of the Ogoni-Shell Reconciliation. Additionally, between 2007 and 2009 he worked also in the committee for electoral reform set up by the Nigerian government.

This Day News reported the passing away and burial of Mama Janet Hauwa Kukah, the bishop's mother, born in June 1934 who was buried in Anchuna, Zangon Kataf Local Government Area, with many dignitaries at attendance and others sending their condolences.

Catholic Church titles
Preceded by Kevin Joseph Aje	Bishop of Sokoto; 2011–present	Incumbent
