= Shehu Shagari College of Education =

Higher education institution in Sokoto, Nigeria

- Type: Public
- Established: 1970
- Provost: Wadata Hakimi
- Location: Sokoto, Sokoto State, Nigeria
- Affiliations: Ahmadu Bello University and Usmanu Danfodiyo University
- Website: Official website

The Shehu Shagari College of Education is a state government higher education institution located in Sokoto, Sokoto State, Nigeria. It is affiliated to Ahmadu Bello University and Usmanu Danfodiyo University for its degree programmes. The current Provost is Dr. Umar Tambari.

== History ==
The Shehu Shagari College of Education was established in 1970. It was formerly known as Advanced Teacher's College until 1995.

The Shehu Shagari College of Education, Sokoto, which started on a modest note way back in 1970 as Advanced Teachers college (ATC) at a temporary site in Sokoto town, was then the first fully state-owned Advanced Teachers College in the Northern states of Nigeria. It commenced operation precisely on 14 October 1970 with an initial intake of sixty seven students and six teaching staff. The primary purpose of its establishment was to address the acute shortage of post-primary school teachers in the then North- western state, following rapid educational expansion at both primary and post-primary school levels. The college moved to its present permanent site in June 1974, and has to date, been headed by 14 chief Executives at different times under different nomenclatures.

On 12 May 2022 Deborah Samuel Yakubu, a Christian student at the college was stoned to death by Muslim fellow students over alleged blasphemy. No one was convicted for her murder.

== Courses ==
The institution offers the following courses;

- Education and Arabic
- Education and Chemistry
- Technical Education
- Early Childhood Care Education
- Education and Biology
- Integrated Science
- Fulfulde
- Education and Geography
- Education and History
- Computer Education
- Education and Social Studies
- Hausa
- Education and Economics
- Islamic Studies
- Education and Mathematics
- Business Education
- Primary Education Studies
- French
- Physical and Health Education
- Agricultural Science and Education
- Education and Integrated Science
- Fine And Applied Arts
- Education and English Language
- Home Economics and Education
- Special Education
- Education and Islamic Studies
- Education and micro biology

== Affiliation ==
The institution is affiliated with the Ahmadu Bello University and Usmanu Danfodiyo University to offer programmes leading to Bachelor of Education, (B.Ed.) in;

- Chemistry
- Physical & Health Education
- Mathematics
- Social Studies Education
- Hausa
- Arabic
- Business Education Studies
- Islamic Studies
- Biology
- Home Economics Education
- History
- English
- Geography
- Integrated Science Education
- Economics
- Agricultural Science Education
- Primary Education Studies
