= Zaria Quds Day massacres =

Attack on a Quds Day parade by the Nigerian military

Zaria Quds day massacres
- Location of Zaria in Nigeria
- Location: 11°04′N 7°42′E; Zaria, Kaduna State, Nigeria
- Date: 25 July 2014
- Target: Shia community, Islamic Movement of Nigeria
- Deaths: 25
- Perpetrator: Nigerian Army

Zaria Quds Day massacres (or Zaria Quds massacres) refers to an incident on 25 July 2014, when the Nigerian Army opened fire on members of the Islamic Movement who were taking part in Quds day rallies, and killed 35 people, including three sons of Ibrahim Zakzaky, leader of the movement. The Islamic Movement and Islamic Human Rights Commission claimed that Nigerian government's ties with Israel were responsible for the attacks on the pro-Palestinian group.

== Course of events ==
The incident occurred barely three days after twin bomb attacks had taken place in Kaduna State. According to eyewitnesses, the demonstrators approached a military checkpoint, where they were ordered by soldiers to take another route. The demonstrators rebuffed the order and a standoff ensued. Soldiers then fired warning shots in an attempt to scare the protesters, but the protesters surged forward and threw rocks at the soldiers. As a result, the soldiers opened fire.

== Statements ==
Zakzaky said,

I am appealing to my followers to be patient and remain calm. After the burial of those killed, we will decide what action to take. I have communicated with the authorities, and they are all claiming not to be aware of the operation. It is my belief that the operation was ordered from Abuja.

Ibrahim Musa, the editor of Al-Mizan, the weekly newspaper published by the group, said in a statement, "Reports reaching our news desk now indicated that some soldiers of the Nigerian army have opened fire on the tail end of the Quds procession held after Jumaat prayers in Zaria, Kaduna State. The Quds procession was held today peacefully in more than 10 Nigerian cities. Why the attack on the Zaria procession?"

The Director of Army Public Relations, Brigadier General Olajide Laleye, told the News Agency of Nigeria (NAN) that the investigation would establish what happened. “However, what is already clear is that Nigerian Army troops did not initiate firing and only acted in self-defence after being fired upon,” Laleye said.

== Motives behind the attack ==
The IMN and the Islamic Human Rights Commission (IHRC), among other Islamic NGOs, claimed that the Nigerian government's close ties with Israel prompted the attack. The chair of the IHRC, Massoud Shadjareh, said:

This is a heinous act, that sadly is not isolated in the history of this event in Nigeria. It appears that Nigerian security co-operation with Israel grows year on year, with its military targeting peaceful pro-Palestinian activism. It is disgusting. We extend our condolences to the families of the deceased, who must be considered far flung victims of the latest Israeli aggression.

S. M. Mohamed Idris, Chairman of Citizens International, Malaysia said:

The crackdown on pro-Palestinian protesters appears to be the consideration for the security assistance provided by the Zionist regime. It is a shame that the current Nigerian government has abandoned the decades-long support of the Nigerian people and government for the Palestinian liberation struggle.

== See also ==
- 2015 Zaria massacre
