= Creighton Lovelace =

- Born: December 15, 1981 (age 44); Shelby, North Carolina, United States
- Occupations: Pastor, Teacher
- Political party: Republican Party
- Other political affiliations: Constitution Party (2000 - 2008)

Creighton Lee Lovelace (born December 15, 1981) is an American Christian minister, currently the pastor of Danieltown Baptist Church in Forest City, North Carolina. Lovelace and his church received brief international attention in May 2005 over a controversial sign on the Danieltown church's grounds that read, "The Koran needs to be flushed!"

This appeared in The Daily Courier, the local newspaper covering Forest City, in a story written by Josh Humphries shortly after a May 1, 2005, report in Newsweek that US officials had flushed a Koran down a toilet at Guantanamo Bay detainment camp (see Qur'an desecration controversy of 2005). Newsweek retracted the story, and apologized on May 15, Despite official reports corroborating the story, Multiple Qurans had been desecrated in some way, some thrown in toilets. The original report received widespread international attention and sparked protests in Muslim countries: Palestine, Egypt, Sudan, Pakistan, Afghanistan, and Indonesia. At least fifteen people in died in a protest riot in Jalalabad, Afghanistan over the story.

Lovelace and his church posted the sign as the Newsweek controversy unfolded. This inflammatory message received attention from the Associated Press, all major United States news networks, and various international publications. In a May 25 MSNBC interview, Lovelace denied that his congregation desecrated any actual Qurans. Unapologetic for the sign, he said the message was "a figure of speech." In Christian theology Muslims cannot enter heaven.

In a Christianity Today article about the Danieltown Baptist Church sign, Anthony McRoy wrote:

"Muslims have a saying: 'Kill me, but do not mock my faith.' In Islamic jurisprudence, blasphemy is considered a capital crime, and the laws of states such as Pakistan reflect this. Muslims around the world will feel this sign is an attack on their honor, and in Muslim cultures honor can only be avenged with blood. Inevitably local Christians in Iraq and Pakistan, missionaries, and anyone with white skin will be considered fair game, as will church buildings."

No specific attacks on Christians, United States citizens, or white people have been linked to this incident.

Following two days of intense and universally negative press coverage, Lovelace issued an apology. On June 8, 2005, the Associated Baptist Press reported that Danieltown Baptist Church had withdrawn from the Southern Baptist Convention, the Baptist State Convention of North Carolina and the local Sandy Run Baptist Association.

== Personal life ==
Since 2023, Creighton Lee Lovelace has been married to Stacy Lovelace, and has 3 adopted sons; Alexander, Michael, and Chris.

== See also ==
- Christian right
- Qur'an desecration controversy of 2005
- Religious intolerance
