= Lynching of Deborah Yakubu =

2022 Islamist lynching of student accused of blasphemy in Nigeria

Killing of Deborah Samuel Yakubu
- Date: 12 May 2022
- Location: Shehu Shagari College of Education, Sokoto, Nigeria
- Cause: Accusations of blasphemy against Islam
- Motive: Islamism
- Perpetrator: Muslim students
- Deaths: 1
- Property damage: Catholic churches and a hospital complex
- Suspects: 2 arrested and acquitted
- Charges: Criminal conspiracy and inciting public disturbance
- Verdict: Acquittal

On 12 May 2022, Deborah Samuel Yakubu, a second-year Nigerian Christian college student, was stoned to death by a mob of Muslim students in Sokoto, Nigeria, after being accused of blasphemy against Islam. The Muslim suspects arrested were charged with "criminal conspiracy and incitement of public disturbance", bailable offences with a maximum two year jail time. A team of 34 lawyers led by Prof. Mansur Ibrahim defended the suspects who were subsequently acquitted by the court citing non-showing of prosecution lawyers.

== Background ==
Nigeria is roughly evenly divided into a largely Muslim north and a Christian south. Twelve of Nigeria's 36 states are Muslim-majority with Sunni Islam as the predominant religion, and they operate Sharia courts as well as irreligious customary courts. Sharia courts may treat blasphemy against Islam as deserving of several punishments up to, and including, execution.

Vigilantism and extrajudicial killings have sometimes occurred after accusations of blasphemy.

== Lynching ==
Yakubu, a Christian, was accused of posting a blasphemous statement against the Islamic prophet Muhammad. She allegedly made a comment on WhatsApp, criticising the religion-related posts that Muslim classmates discussed in the study group she believed should have been reserved for academic purposes.

On 12 May 2022, Yakubu was forcibly taken from the security room she was hidden in at the Shehu Shagari College of Education in Sokoto. A cab had been waiting outside the school to escort her to safety at the police station. Within the college premises, a Muslim student mob stoned Yakubu, before placing tires on her and setting her body on fire. According to witnesses, security forces fired tear gas and warning shots but failed to disperse the mob. A student who had witnessed the lynching recounted that Yakubu's last words were "What do you hope to achieve with this?", and that Christian students fled the premises during the lynching. A video of the murder circulated on social media.

== Aftermath ==
Governor Aminu Tambuwal ordered the indefinite closure of the college immediately after the incident, and opened an investigation.

Two students identified from the video were arrested in connection with the lynching. However, none have been prosecuted. One Muslim perpetrator had filmed himself proclaiming that he did it in graphic terms. A Nigerian police officer filmed himself endorsing the Islamist lynching and called any one who questioned the act a "Kafir" (Islamic term for an infidel).

Following the lynching there was violence against other Christian sites, according to a statement released by the Catholic Diocese of Sokoto. "During the protest, groups of youths led by some adults in the background attacked the Holy Family Catholic Cathedral at Bello Way, destroying church glass windows, those of the Bishop Lawton Secretariat, and vandalised a community bus parked within the premises. St. Kevin's Catholic Church was also attacked and partly burnt; windows of the new hospital complex under construction, in the same premises, were shattered. The hoodlums also attacked the Bakhita Centre […], burning down a bus within the premises."

The two Muslim suspects were defended by a team of 34 lawyers led by Prof. Mansur Ibrahim. They were charged with "criminal conspiracy and incitement of public disturbance", a charge that carries a maximum sentence of two years. The court acquitted the suspects citing the non-appearance of prosecution lawyers. Human rights lawyer Ebun-Olu Adegboruwa has described the charges pressed by the police as "an insult to Nigerians and to the parents of the deceased". He also criticised Governor Aminu Tambuwal of Sokoto, saying that the governor as a former lawyer knew the law but wanted to override the life of a citizen entrusted to his care with his political ambition. He called on the governor to "rather resign now than go down in history as the Governor under whose watch a citizen was murdered and he could not enforce the laws of the land but rather aided and abetted its cover up".

== Reactions ==
President Muhammadu Buhari claimed that "Muslims all over the world demand respect for the Holy Prophets, including Isah (Alaihissalaam, Jesus Christ) and Muhammad (SAW) but where transgressions occur, as alleged to be the case in this instance, the law does not allow anyone to take matters into their hands." He extended his condolences to the victim's family and commended the state government's "prompt response and investigation". Presidential opposition candidate Atiku Abubakar was heavily criticised for taking down social media posts condemning the killing after receiving backlash from Muslim supporters.

Religious leaders throughout the country as well as leaders of the Christian Association of Nigeria called for the swift prosecution of Yakubu's killers. The Christian Association of Nigeria also requested the government not to "resort to usual rhetoric" and cover up the lynching. Sultan of Sokoto Sa’adu Abubakar III and the Sokoto Sultanate Council also condemned the "unfortunate happenings" and urged security agencies to bring the perpetrators to justice. Other prominent Muslim leaders condemned "acts of insult or provocation against God, his prophets and religion" and called for stricter blasphemy laws to "maintain peace". The British High Commissioner to Nigeria Catriona Laing condemned the killing and urged that the authorities "ensure the perpetrators of this horrific act are made to face justice in line with the law." International Catholic charity Aid to the Church in Need also condemned the murder, with executive president Thomas Heine-Geldern saying "The levels of extremism and violence reached in Nigeria over the last few years are absolutely appalling. Hardly a week goes by without news of kidnappings and dozens of deaths, but this barbaric act leaves us speechless".

== See also ==
- Blasphemy in Nigeria
- Blasphemy laws
