= Kakuri =

Residential area in Kaduna State, Nigeria

- Suburb
- Location within Nigeria
- Country: Nigeria
- State: Kaduna State
- LGA: Kaduna South
- City: Kaduna
- Time zone: UTC+1 (WAT)

Kakuri is a residential area in Nigeria. It is a suburb of Kaduna and is under the Kaduna South Local Government. Though it does not have a railway station it is the centre of Kaduna's industry.

== Infrastructure ==
Below are the infrastructures in kakuri:

- Saint Gerard's Hospital
- Dr. Gwamna Awan General Hospital
- A Government Secondary School, a school of psychiatric nursing, St. Anne's Nursery and Primary School, Victory Academy, Christ Comprehensive College, Willson College, Piety Nursery and Primary School, Second ECWA secondary school, and Excel College.
- Nigerian-German Chemicals PLC.
- Prosan Engineering
- Peugeot Automobile Nigeria and Chanchangi Motors Ltd.
- Christ Apostolic Church, St. Andrew Catholic Church, and St. Paul's Anglican Church.
- Developmental Association for Renewable Energies.
- Kaduna Textile Limited (KTL) and United Nigeria Textile Limited (UNTL).
- Magistrate Court

== Geography ==
Areas surrounding Kakuri include the Nassarawa to the north, Trikania to the west, Barnawa to the east and Gonigora to the south.

== Notable people ==
- Matthew Kukah, the then-Vicar General of the Catholic Diocese of Kaduna lived in Kakuri and now bishop of Sokoto.
- The former president of Nigeria Olusegun Obasanjo has worked in the Armed forces in Kakuri. Chief Omadachi Egboche former Chairman Licensed Electrical contractor Association of Nigeria (LECAN Kakuri branch) was a Resident.
