= Michael James Dempsey =

His Excellency, The Most Reverend Michael J. Dempsey, OP OP
- Bishop of Sokoto
- Church: Catholic Church
- Appointed: July 13, 1967
- In office: October 1, 1967 - December 3, 1984
- Predecessor: Edward Thaddeus Lawton, O.P.
- Successor: Kevin J. Aje

Orders
- Ordination: June 11, 1942 by Bernard J. Sheil
- Consecration: August 15, 1967 by John Cody

Personal details
- Born: February 12, 1912 Providence, Rhode Island, US
- Died: March 19, 1996 (aged 84) Denver, Colorado, US

Michael James Dempsey, OP (February 12, 1912 – March 19, 1996) was an American-born Catholic prelate who served as Bishop of Sokoto in Nigeria from 1967 to 1984. He was a member of the Dominican Order.

== Early life and education ==
James Edward Dempsey was born in Providence, Rhode Island, to Joseph M. Demspey and Julia Mary McSherry. He was educated at St. Mary's Grade School, LaSalle Academy and Providence College all in Providence. Dempsey entered the Dominican novitiate at St. Rose Priory in Springfield, Kentucky, and took the religious name Michael. He made his first profession of vows on August 16, 1936. Philosophical studies were taken at the Dominican House of Studies in River Forest, Illinois, and Dempsey made his solemn profession on August 16, 1939. He decided to join the newly established Province of St. Albert the Great and continued his theological studies at River Forest. Dempsey was ordained a priest by Bishop Bernard J. Sheil on June 11, 1942.

== Priesthood ==
Michael Dempsey taught English and religion at Fenwick High School in Oak Park, Illinois, from 1943 to 1950. At the same time, he obtained a master's degree in English literature at DePaul University in Chicago. In 1951, he entered the missionary field in Nigeria. He served five terms as pastor and local superior at St. Dominic's Parish in Yaba, Lagos. He was on leave from January 24, 1955, to February 2, 1956. When he returned, he was made the Vicar Provincial for the Dominicans of Nigeria. His responsibilities were reduced to Yaba from 1959 to 1962. On August 27, 1965, Dempsey was appointed the vicar of the Nigerian Vicariate.

== Bishop of Sokoto ==
On July 13, 1967, Pope Paul VI appointed him as the Bishop of Sokoto. He was consecrated a bishop by Cardinal John Cody of Chicago on August 15, 1967, at St. Pius V Church in Chicago. The principal co-consecrators were Archbishop John Kwao Amuzu Aggey of Lagos and Chicago auxiliary bishop Aloysius John Wycislo. He was installed as the diocesan bishop in Sokoto on October 1, 1967, and continued to serve there until his resignation was accepted by Pope John Paul II on December 3, 1984.

Before his appointment as bishop there were anti-Igbo and anti-Christian riots in 1966 that left the diocese of Sokoto without most of its people, its only indigenous priest fled, and many of its church buildings were destroyed. He focused on the northern part of his diocese, where the people remained, and opened the first secondary school in Gusau in 1968. The civil war ended in 1970 and the Catholic people began to return to the Sokoto diocese. The oil industry expanded in the 1970s and that helped to increase the size of the diocese. The Dominican sisters opened a house in Gusau. The catechetical school at Malumfashi trained catechists for northern Nigeria. Successful evangelization efforts were made among the Hausa people. Good relations were maintained with Muslims and other Christian churches. Dempsey suffered several minor strokes toward the end of his time as bishop. He was also the only non-Nigerian bishop in the country. He had to check in and out with the police when he left Sokoto State to enter Katsina State, which was also a part of the diocese.

== Later life and death ==
In the autumn of 1985, Dempsey returned to the United States. He took up residence at St. Dominic Priory in Denver, Colorado, and helped out at St. Dominic parish, where he ministered to the sick and aged. His health declined, and he moved into the Mullen Home, which was operated by the Little Sisters of the Poor in Denver. He died there at the age of 84 on March 19, 1996. Archbishop J. Francis Stafford of Denver celebrated the funeral on March 25, 1996, at St. Dominic's Church. Bishop Dempsey was buried in the Dominican plot at Mount Olivet Cemetery.
