= Edward Thaddeus Lawton =

American-born Catholic bishop in Nigeria (1913–1966)

Most Reverend Edward T. Lawton, OP
- Bishop of Sokoto
- Church: Catholic Church
- Appointed: June 16, 1964
- In office: August 15, 1964 - December 19, 1966
- Successor: Michael James Dempsey, OP

Orders
- Ordination: June 6, 1943
- Consecration: August 15, 1964 by John McCarthy, S.M.A.

Personal details
- Born: October 12, 1913 Boston, Massachusetts, USA
- Died: December 19, 1966 (aged 53) Sokoto State, Nigeria

Edward T. Lawton, OP (October 12, 1913 – December 19, 1966) was an American-born bishop of the Catholic Church. He served as the bishop of the Diocese of Sokoto in Nigeria from 1964 to 1966.

== Early life and education ==
Born in South Boston in Massachusetts, Lawton was educated at St. Francis de Sales School, Boston College High School, and Boston College. He entered the Dominican novitiate at St. Rose Priory in Springfield, Kentucky and he made his first profession of vows on August 16, 1937. His philosophical and theological studies were taken at the Dominican House of Studies in River Forest, Illinois and he was ordained a priest there on June 6, 1943.

== Priesthood ==
Lawton's first assignment as a priest was teaching at Fenwick High School in Oak Park, Illinois where he remained until 1951. That year he entered the missionary field in Nigeria. He became the director of the Thomistic Institute where he lectured at both Yaba and Lagos. Lawton gave retreats to priests and religious during breaks in the academic year. He also served as the archdiocesan director for Catholic radio programs. The Prefecture of Sokoto was established on January 15, 1954, and he was appointed its first Prefect Apostolic. He was invested on November 13, 1954, at St. Pius V Church in Chicago. He initially established himself at Gusau. The prefecture had 1,200 Catholics among five million people, most of whom were Muslim. He served there with one other priest until 1956 when fellow Dominicans from the St. Albert the Great Province in the United States arrived as well as Dominican Sisters from Great Bend, Kansas. He moved from Gusau to Sokoto in 1961. He suffered several health problems, including a heart attack. The prefecture grew to more than 10,000 people and it was elevated to a diocese on June 16, 1964.

== Bishop of Sokoto ==
On June 16, 1964 Pope Paul VI appointed Lawton as the first Bishop of Sokoto. He was consecrated a bishop by Archbishop John McCarthy, S.M.A. of Kaduna on August 15, 1964. The principal co-consecrators were Bishop John J. Reddington, S.M.A. of Jos and Auxiliary Bishop John Kwao Amuzu Aggey of Lagos. He attended the last two sessions of the Second Vatican Council in 1964 and 1965. While traveling in an automobile he suffered a coronary thrombosis and died on December 19, 1966. His funeral was held the following day at Our Lady of Fatima Church in Gusau and his body was laid to rest in the cemetery adjacent to the church.
