= Killing of Pro-Biafra Protesters (2015–2016) =

The 2015–2016 Killing of Biafran Protesters was the killing of demonstrators demanding the restoration of the sovereignty of the Republic of Biafra by Nigerian security forces, especially the Nigerian army, across the southeastern parts of Nigeria. The demonstrations were spearheaded by several separatist movements. In addition, residents of the above-mentioned region have often been subjected to conditions synonymous with those obtainable in a Police State.

The South-East Based Coalition of Human Rights Organizations (SBCHROs) estimates that about 80 members of the pro-Biafra group the Indigenous People of Biafra (IPOB) and their supporters have been killed by Nigerian security operatives under the directive of the Nigerian government between 30 August 2015 and 9 February 2016.

The most notable incidents were the protests that took place in Onitsha on December 2, 2015 where about 11 people reportedly died, including 2 policemen and 9 activists; and in Aba on February 9, 2016 where six members of the secessionist group Indigenous People of Biafra (IPOB) were allegedly killed by Nigerian security forces and about 20 others arrested. Also, the Indigenous People of Biafra claimed that Nigerian soldiers clandestinely killed and burned the corpses of Biafran activists in a separate incident in Aba.

In addition to the killings, members of the Igbo ethnic group, who are at the forefront of the secessionist agitations, have been targeted by Nigerian security operatives. On 23 December 2015, many Igbos returning home for Christmas celebrations from the western part of the country were detained on the Onitsha Niger River Bridge for several hours by soldiers conducting stop and search operations. The gridlock occasioned by this lasted for up to twelve hours with many commuters spending the night on both ends of the bridge.

The Nigerian military and Federal Government have denied engaging in any of these acts. On 24 November 2016, Amnesty International accused Nigerian security forces of killing at least 150 Biafra's secession peaceful advocates. The rights group also said Nigerian military fired live ammunition, with little or no warning, to disperse members of the Indigenous People of Biafra (IPOB) group between August 2015 and August 2016. The military and police dismissed the allegations and said it was aimed to tarnish the security forces reputation.

== Biafra Day demonstrations ==
The 30 May 2016 Biafra Day Demonstrations – a series of protests that commemorate the 1967 declaration of the independence of the Biafran region from Nigeria – turned bloody in several cities across southeastern Nigeria as Nigerian security forces clashed with pro-Biafra groups. The local media, citing eye witness reports, said that 40 people were killed, while over 50 pro-Biafra members were arrested in the commercial city of Onitsha during the protests. The incident, according to one of the eyewitnesses, began at about 3 a.m. when security forces invaded the premises of a Catholic church in Nkpor Agu, near Onitsha, where pro-Biafrans were camped and allegedly opened fire. Five civilians were estimated to have been killed, while ten others were injured. 35 more deaths were recorded following further swoops on other members of the pro-Biafra group in the commercial city by security forces. Nnamdi kanu was also at national park, South Africa to mark the sit at home order, 30 May 2019.

The International Society for Civil Liberties and the Rule of Law, a civil rights group, said its investigation revealed that security operatives shot, killed, picked corpses and buried the victims in unknown places.

A statement released by the Nigerian Army claimed it attacked the activists "due to the widespread panic, tension and apprehension generated from the activities of the MASSOB and IPOB members."

== Domestic and international reactions ==
Former Deputy Leader of the British Labour Party, Harriet Harman, petitioned the British Secretary of State for Foreign and Commonwealth Affairs, Philip Hammond, for the release of the detained leader of the Indigenous People of Biafra Nnamdi Kanu, while Amnesty International stated that it has been working on "consistent" reports of the use of "excessive force" against protesters connected to the pro-Biafran movement.

A report by Amnesty International accuses the Nigerian military of killing at least 17 unarmed Biafran separatists in the city of Onitsha prior to a march on 30 May 2016 commemorating the 49th anniversary of the initial secession of Biafra.

The European Union through its High Representative for Foreign Affairs and Security Policy, Federica Mogherini had previously said it was in support of the peaceful conduct of a referendum on independence.

Reacting to the Biafran Day killings, the Deputy President of the Nigerian Senate, Ike Ekweremadu, lamented that "in a democracy people should be entitled to speak their minds and to assemble under responsible circumstances." Responding to the agitations for the re-secession of Biafra occasioned by perceptions of marginalisation, a former Vice President of Nigeria, Atiku Abubakar, advocated for the restructuring of Nigeria to remove the impediments to the economic and political development of the country and put to bed cries of injustice.
