= Islamic Movement (Nigeria) =

Part of islam in Nigeria

Islamic Movement of Nigeria
- Leader: Ibrahim Zakzaky
- Founded: 1970s
- Banned: 2019
- Headquarters: Husainiyya Baqiyatullah; Zaria, Nigeria
- Ideology: Islamism; Qutbism; Khomeinism; Anti-Zionism
- Religion: Shia Islam

Website
- Official website

The Islamic Movement of Nigeria (Arabic: الحركة الاسلامية في نيجيريا) is a banned Shia religious organization which aims to establish an Islamic state in Nigeria. It was founded by Ibrahim Zakzaky, who was inspired by the Iranian Revolution and rejects the authority of the Nigerian Government. The movement focuses on a nonviolent approach toward achieving an Islamic State, which has established some legitimacy as an alternative government. The IMN is headquartered at the spiritual center, Husainiyya Baqiyatullah, in Zaria with the group's numbers estimated around 5% of Nigeria's Muslim population of 100 million. While the main focus of the group is Islamic studies and enlightenment, Zakzaky has also encouraged his followers to pursue Western education and engage in charity work. Currently, the leader of the movement, Zakzaky, was in jail recently, and the group organized protests for his release that have resulted in conflict with the Government.

On 26 July 2019, the Nigerian Government banned the IMN, claiming that the group's actions were both terrorist and illegal in nature. The ban was issued a week after a protest for Zakzaky's freedom in the capital Abuja where 11 protestors, a journalist, and a police officer died. However, the group has denied being behind any of the violence and accused the government of killing peaceful protestors. It appears that the IMN has been on the receiving end of violent attacks by the Nigerian Government, most notably the Zaria Massacre and the 2014 raid on the Husainiyah. The Zaria Massacre was a well documented violent attack on the IMN resulting in the death of at least 348 civilians. In the 2014 raid on the Husainiyah, three of Zakzaky's sons were killed along with 34 members of the Islamic Movement of Nigeria. The Islamic Human Rights Commission indicted the Nigerian Army for a human rights violation but there were no prosecutions. Human Rights Watch has declared the ban a threat to the rights of all Nigerian citizens and is an affront to the groups right to gather and peacefully protest. The group does not appear to be in compliance with the ban as Free Zakzaky Protests are still being organized on their website.

== Founder ==
Sheikh Zakzaky (born 5 May 1953) first came in contact with formal Islamic education at the Provincial Arabic School in Zaria. He then attended the prestigious School of Arabic Studies as well as Ahmadu Bello University and earned an advanced degree in economics. As a student, Zakzaky was a very active member of the Muslim Student Society until he was expelled from his university. Zakzaky is both a scholar and an activist focusing on the learning, research, and teaching of Islamic Studies, and is recognized as the founder of the Islamic Movement of Nigeria. The movement calls for the rejection of the Nigerian Constitution and an Islamic Revolution that focuses on enlightenment. He is also believed to have started the nationwide demonstrations in support of the inclusion of Shariah law in the Nigerian Constitution. Zakzaky has been jailed by the Nigerian government since 1984 and has continued to face persecution under multiple regimes because his beliefs were considered treasonous. One of his arrests was for stating that “there is no government except that of Islam”. In response to the arrest of their leader, the Islamic movement in Nigeria has been holding peaceful free Zakzaky protests that will continue until Zakzaky is released.

== Branches ==
The Islamic Movement has well organized branches and infrastructure in almost 35 States in Nigeria. Each branch has a dedicated goal and purpose for advancing the Islamic Movement and appear to be largely self-sufficient. The Islamic Movement's website lists the 10 branches of the movement:

=== Academic Forum ===
The Academic Forum is a branch of the Islamic movement that focuses on intellectual, cultural and civilizational advancement through intellectual revolution. Members include academic and non-academic staff as well as students. Activities of this branch include the following events:

- Annual Imam's week in commemoration of late Ayatollah Ruhullah Al-Musawi Al-Komeini,
- Annual national conference on Islamic thought
- Joint Academic/Sisters Forum national conference
- Conduction of Islamic Vocation Course for secondary and tertiary students
- Weekly visitations of secondary schools
- Weekly conduction of Ta'alimat in various campuses within the country
- Weekly article release
- Organizing tutorials in campuses
- Organizing lessons for Secondary schools students.

=== Resource Forum ===
This branch is made up of working class members who are in various sectors in the economy. Their main activity includes organizing lectures, seminars, and publications.

=== Islamic Movement Production ===
Incorporated into the Islamic Movement in 2006, the mission of this branch is to produce Islamically oriented films that are aligned with Islamic beliefs, values, and cultures. The first production was a two part film title KARBALA and was based on the struggle of Imam Hussein. Islamic Movement Production is currently making an appeal to create a film on the life of Shaikh Uthman Ibn Fodio to better represent him as a religious scholar and revolutionary. Shaikh Zakzaky called the making of a film on Shaikh Uthman a duty of the Islamic movement because the Nigerian government refused to accurately portray Shaikh Uthman.

=== Shuhada Foundation ===
The Shuhada Foundation is a non-governmental registered organization that organizes public lectures, seminars, and an annual Yaumu Shuhada celebration to commemorate the martyrdom of Shuhada the 116 other martyrs of the Islamic Movement. The creation of the foundation followed brutal attacks by the Military Dictatorship of Nigeria that resulted in the death of members and left 128 children as orphans. The branch also provides both material and spiritual assistance to the orphans and most of their funding comes from donations.

=== Sisters Forum ===
The Sisters Forum was created at the beginning of the Islamic Movement and has a large role within the movement. The founder Shaikh Zakzaky emphasized women having equal and full participation in the movement and provided resources for this branch to be self dependent in organizing activities. Women historically have not had a role in Islamic activities, but Zakzaky argued that women need to study Islam in order to answer to Allah on the day of resurrection. The members of this branch have organized Tadribs, organizing conferences, lectures, production of films, visiting patients in hospitals, Majlis, and writing. These activities are educational and religiously based, and focused on women developing a strong link to their Creator through acts of worship. The Sisters Forum has also staged protests calling for the release of Zakzaky and other members jailed by the Nigerian government and addressed the press, which was traditionally not allowed for women.

=== IM Publication ===
This branch is responsible for the publication of the newspaper, the Poniter Express and the Almizan.

=== Madrasa Branch: The Fudiyyah Islamic Center ===
A Madrassa is an institute of higher education that teaches Arabic grammar and literature, mathematics, logic, natural science, and Islamic theology and law. The Islamic Movement of Nigeria created the Fudiyyah Islamic Center in 2002 along the Kaduna-Kano Express near Dan Magaji Wusasa Junction. The Fudiyyah Islamic Center hosts seminars, meetings, and conferences by all the branches of the movement on a weekly, biweekly, monthly, quarterly, and annual basis. The Islamic Movement has also acquired land a kilometer away from the Islamic Center to build a complete Madrasa through the donation of members from the Islamic Movement. The Islamic school has also created Fudiyyah Schools in nearly 200 towns, villages, and cities that provide both scientific and Islamic education.

The AhlulBayt News Agency reported that Kaduna State government personnel demolished the Fudiyyah School in Zaria without issuing a warning. This is part of the Nigerian government clamping down on the members of the Islamic Movement.

=== The Poets ===
Poetry historically contributed to the teachings and advancement of Islam and the Islamic Movement has dedicated a branch responsible for creating poetry that enlightens the masses. Members songs are recorded in audio, video, and transcribed into books for circulation.

=== ISMA Medical Care Initiatives ===
The ISMA Medical Care Initiatives branch of the Islamic Movement has conducted seminars and provided medical services to members of the movement and the general public. This branch also seeks to promote the role of Islam in the medical field. The ISMA is also aiming to establish training schools, clinics, hospitals, research centers, and pharmacies and build a medical infrastructure. One publication from the ISMA Medical Care Initiative included an article on proper care for the newborn. Members of this branch include nurses, pharmacists, doctors, laboratory scientists, biomedical engineers, community health workers, and First Aid responders as well as others.

=== The Guards ===
The Guards mainly provide security during IMN events as well as making proper arrangements during events.

== See also ==
- Religion in Nigeria
  - Shia in Nigeria
- Qasim Umar Sokoto
- Hezbollah Movement in Iran
- Hezbollah Movement in Iraq
- Sadrist Movement
- Ansar-e Hezbollah (Iran)
- Hezbollah (Lebanon)
- Kata'ib Hezbollah (Iraq)
- Harakah Hezbollah al-Nujaba (Iraq)
- Jaysh al-Mahdi (Iraq)
- Liwa Assad Allah (Iraq & Syria)
- Jaysh al-Mu'ammal (Iraq & Syria)
- Hezbollah al-Hejaz (Saudi Arabia)
- Harakah al-Sabireen (Palestine)
