= Ibrahim Zakzaky =

Nigerian Islamic scholar

Sheikh, Hujjat al-Islam Ibrahim Zakzaky
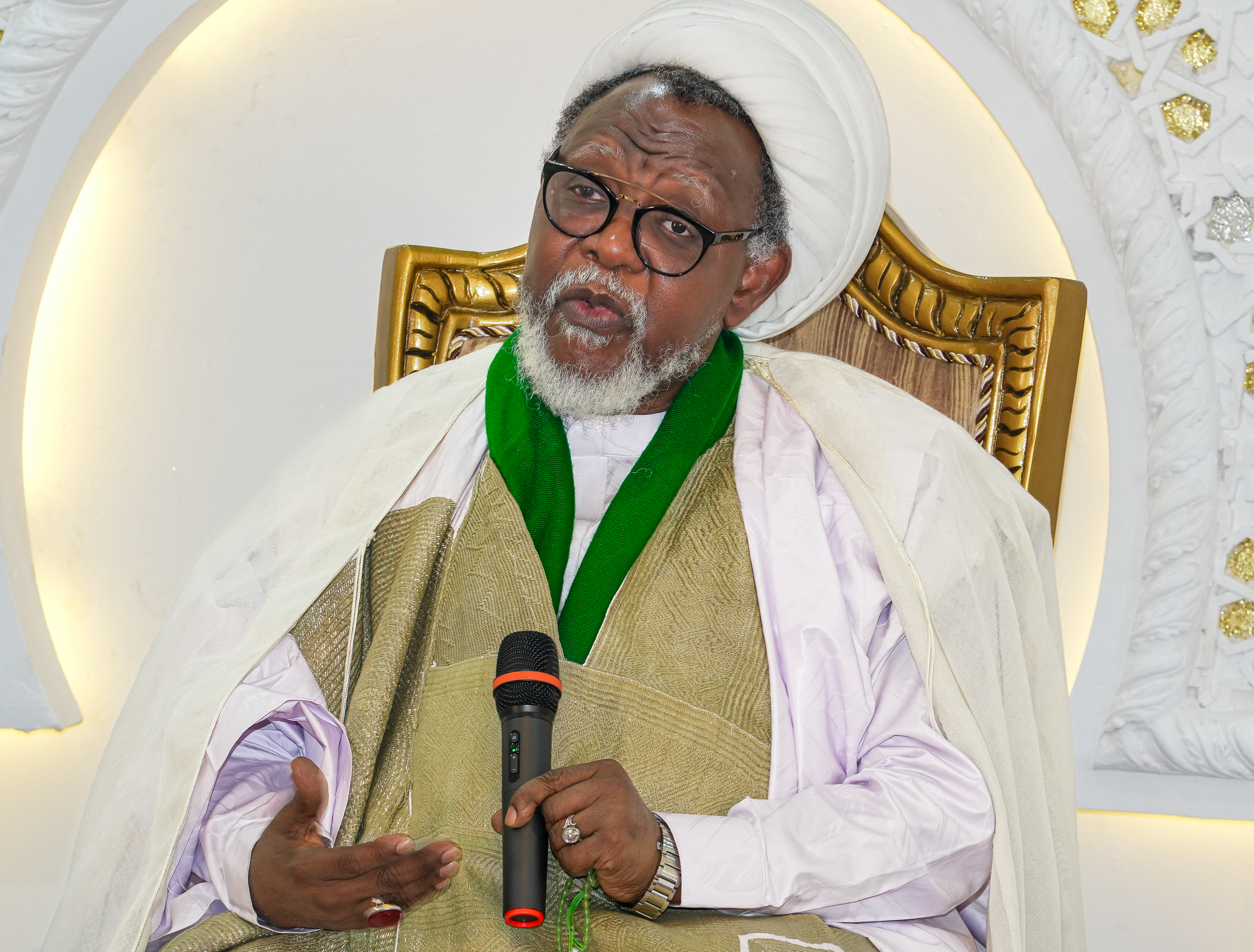
- Zakzaky in 2025
- Born: 5 May 1953 (age 73); Zaria, Colonial Nigeria
- Other name: Sharfuddeen
- Education: Ahmadu Bello University (economics)
- Years active: 1979–present
- Known for: Founder of Islamic Movement in Nigeria
- Children: 9: Muhammad; Nusaiba; Suhaila; Ahmad (Killed in 2014); Hameed (Killed in 2014); Mahmud (Killed in 2014); Hammad (Killed in 2015); Ali Haidar (Killed in 2015); Humaid (Killed in 2015)

Ibraheem Yaqoub El-Zakzaky (alternately Ibrahim Zakzaky or Ibrahim Al-Zakzaky; born 5 May 1953) is a Nigerian Shia Muslim cleric and political activist. One of the most outspoken and prominent Nigerian Shia leaders, he has been imprisoned several times for what he sees as injustice, especially the system of corruption in his country. Zakzaky claims that only Islam can offer solution to the complex socio-political problems facing Nigeria, which has over the years stagnated the country's development. In a lecture he has delivered in marking the occasion of Sheikh Uthman Bn Fodio Week (May 2023) organized by the Academic Forum of Islamic Movement, Zakzaky stated that he is continuing the Jihad of Uthman Bn Fodio to make sure that Islam becomes the ruling religion in not only Nigeria but the entirety of West Africa. In a lecture he delivered on the same occasion in Sokoto (20 May 2023), one of his proponents, Dr. Nasir Hashim has claimed that Zakzaky’s dream is the only hope for Africa.

Sheikh Zakzaky is the head of Nigeria's Islamic Movement, which he started in the late 1970s, when he was a student at Ahmadu Bello University, and began propagating Shia Islam around 1979, at the time of the Iranian Revolution—which saw Iran's monarchy overthrown and replaced with an Islamic republic under Ruhollah Khomeini. Zakzaky believed that the establishment of a republic along similar religious lines in Nigeria would be feasible. He has been detained several times due to accusations of civil disobedience or recalcitrance under military regimes in Nigeria during the 1980s and 1990s, and is still viewed with suspicion or as a threat by Nigerian authorities. In December 2015, the Nigerian Army raided his residence in Zaria, seriously injured him, and killed hundreds of his followers. Since then, he has remained under state detention in the nation's capital pending his release, which was ordered in late 2016. In 2019, a court in Kaduna state granted him and his wife bail to seek treatment abroad but they returned from India after 3 days on the premises of unfair treatment and tough restrictions by security operatives deployed to the medical facility.

== Early life and education ==
Ibraheem was born on 5 May 1953 (15 Sha’ban 1372 AH), in Zaria, Kaduna State. He attended the Provincial Arabic School, Zaria (1969-1970), the School for Arabic Studies, Kano from 1971-1976, where he obtained the ‘Grade II’ Certificate, and the Ahmadu Bello University (ABU), Zaria (1976-1979), where he earned a first-class bachelor's degree in Economics. The degree was denied to him by the university authorities due to his Islamist activities. During his university days, he was active in student Islamic unionism, where he became the secretary-general of the Muslim Students Society of Nigeria (MSSN) at the Main Campus of the university (1977/78), and later became Vice President (International Affairs) of the National Body of the MSSN in 1979.

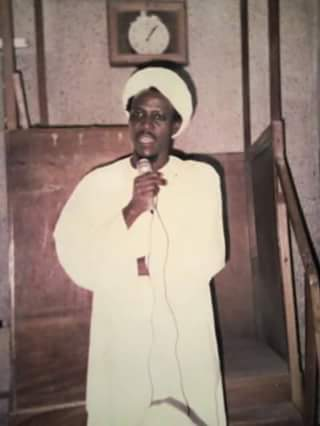
Sheikh Zakzaky giving a lecture at ABU's mosque in the 1990s.

The same year, he is said to have become impressed with the 1979 Iranian Revolution and wanted to emmulate it at home. Later, Zakzaky went to Iran, ultimately becoming a Shia. At home, he became the leader of the Islamic Movement in Nigeria and used it as a way to proselytize and gain followers in the 1990s. As a result of his activities, a significant number of people have converted to Shia Islam in a country once with hardly any Shia population.

== Islamic Movement in Nigeria ==
Ibraheem Zakzaky is the primary figure and spiritual leader of the Islamic Movement in Nigeria (formerly: Muslim Brothers), Africa's most prominent Shi'a Muslim movement. Of Nigeria's 180 million population, around 50 percent are Muslim, a small minority of which belong to Shi'a Islam. According to Nnamdi Obasi, Senior Analyst on Nigeria at the International Crisis Group (ICG), the IMN's goals are twofold: “to ensure more stringent application of Islamic legal and administrative systems...then ultimately to create an Islamic state in Nigeria.” Dr Iqbal Siddiqui described El-Zakzaky as "the de facto leader of the Islamic Movement in Nigeria".

== Israel ==
The Resource Forum of the Islamic Movement of Nigeria (IMN) held a symposium on "The Creation of the Illegal State of Israel" at Arewa House Kaduna on 21 May 2008. Zakzaky stated,

When Israel is celebrating sixty years of occupying Palestine's land, we are mourning because the truth is Israeli State is created on the basis of terrorism and what is not yours is not yours, no matter years of oppression and hostage it would slip someday along with those supporting them. Israel will fall with her allies certainly.

== Nigerian Army attacks against the movement ==
=== Zaria Quds Day Massacre ===
On Friday 25 July 2014, the Nigerian Army reportedly fatally shot 35 followers of Ibraheem Zakzaky, including three of his sons, after a pro-Palestinian procession in Zaria. The British Islamic Human Rights Commission published the report Zaria Massacres and the Role of the Military in October 2014.

=== 2015 Zaria massacre ===
Sheikh al-Zakzaky was injured and arrested along with his wife, in the 2015 Zaria massacre, in which three of his remaining sons, as well as hundreds of his followers, were killed by the Nigerian Army.

=== Detention and ordered release ===
According to the judgment of the high court of Nigeria on 2 December 2016, Ibraheem Yaqoub El Zakzaky was ordered to be released from Department of State Services into police custody within 45 days. El Zakzaky and his wife were to be paid the sum of 50 million Naira ($164,052) in compensation. The judge announced that the justification of "holding him for his own protection" is not sufficient.

On 16 January 2017, Amnesty International demanded that the "Nigerian authorities must immediately comply with a High Court order and release Ibraheem El-Zakzaky and his wife from detention."

On 13 January 2018, Zakzaky, detained at an unknown location without charges since December 2015, made a short public appearance, his first in two years, being allowed to see his doctor. Since 2014, Zakzaky is being held captive by the Nigerian federal government and Kaduna State government for criminal charges. Since then, many of his followers stage protests for his release. The act of detaining Zakzaky without trial was said to be against the law of the federation.

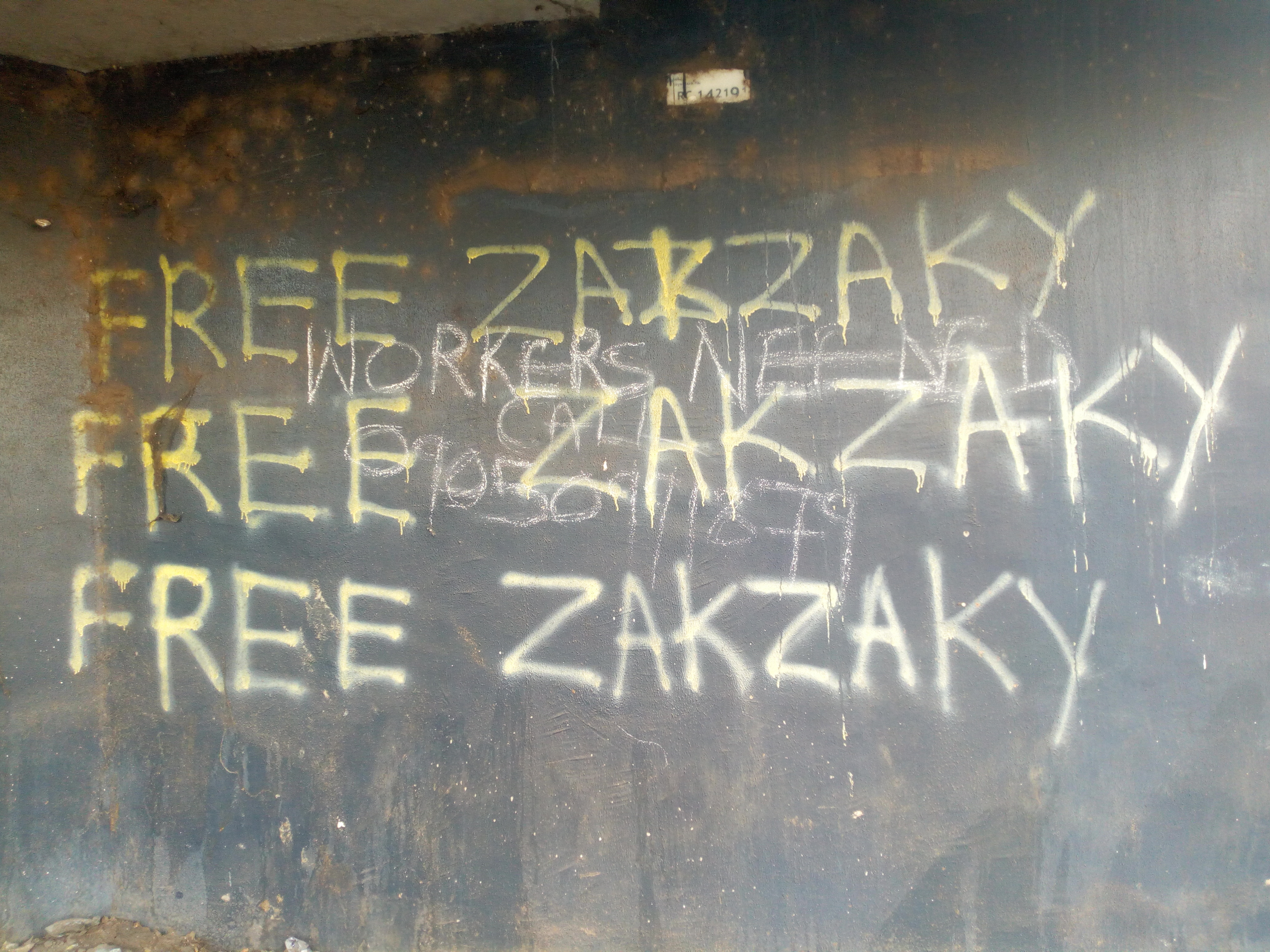
"Free Zakzaky" protest graffiti in Kaduna State

=== 2019 clashes ===
On 22 January 2019, Zakzaky and his wife, Zeenat went to Kaduna High Court for a hearing on a bail application. They were guarded by heavily armed guards as they made their way into the court.

In July 2019, in order to demand the release of Ibraheem el-Zakzaky, hundreds of people gathered outside government buildings and police tried to disperse them by firing guns into the air and using tear gas. During the clashes, two people died and 40 protesters were arrested by police. The Islamic Movement of Nigeria (IMN), a group of Nigeria's minority Shia Muslims, said protests will continue until they secure the release of el-Zakzaky. Abdullahi Murtala, a security analyst said, "Shia Muslims are emboldened by the perceived injustice of an 'immoral state' and will continue their protest and show of defiance against the Buhari government".

Another clash with Nigerian police on 22 July claimed the lives of protestors, police officers and a young reporter, Precious Owolabi from the NYSC. A Deputy Commissioner of Police also lost his life during the clash.

The Muhammadu Buhari-led government proscribed the sect as illegal in Nigeria after meeting with service chiefs over the clash.

== Personal life ==
He is married to Zeenah Ibraheem, with whom he had nine children. Currently, only three of his children (one son and two daughters) are living. Three of his sons were killed in the Zaria Quds Day massacres in 2014. Three more sons were killed in the 2015 Zaria massacre. It was said that he died on 12 December 2022 at the age of 69, but it was proven to be false.

== See also ==
- Tijaniyyah
- Shia Islam in Nigeria
