= Diocese of Sokoto =

Roman Catholic diocese in Nigeria

Diocese of Sokoto Dioecesis Sokotoensis

Location
- Country: Nigeria
- Territory: Nigerian states of Sokoto, Zamfara, Kebbi and Katsina
- Ecclesiastical province: Kaduna
- Metropolitan: Kaduna
- Coordinates: 13°03′39″N 5°14′20″E

Statistics
- Area: 80,000 km^{2} (31,000 sq mi)
- Population: Total; Catholics: (as of 2023); 15,930,561; 21,000 (0.1%)
- Parishes: 17

Information
- Denomination: Roman Catholic
- Rite: Latin Rite
- Established: 16 June 1964
- Cathedral: Holy Family Cathedral, Sokoto
- Secular priests: 42

Current leadership
- Pope: Leo XIV
- Bishop: Matthew Hassan Kukah

Map
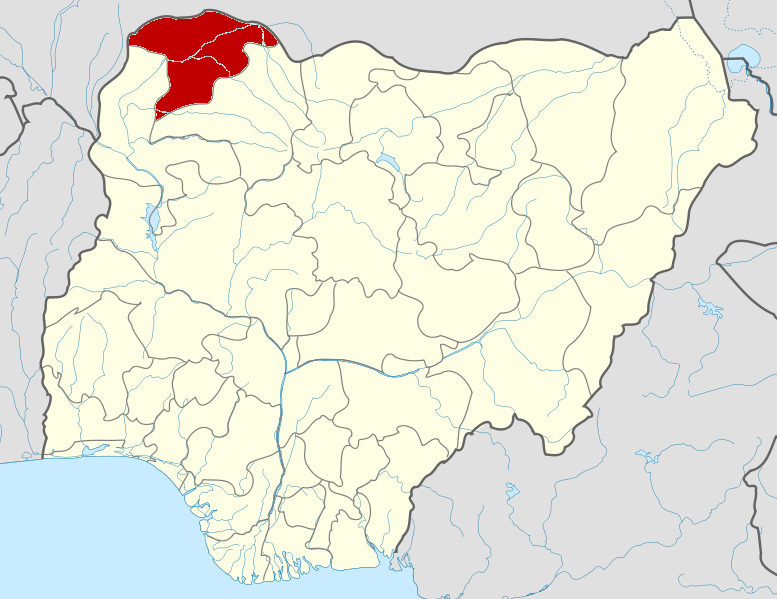
- The Diocese of Sokoto includes all of Sokoto State (shown here in red) as well as portions of neighboring states of Zamfara and Kebbi

The Roman Catholic Diocese of Sokoto (Latin: Sokotoën(sis)) is a diocese located in the city of Sokoto in the ecclesiastical province of Kaduna in Nigeria. Its territory includes the states of Sokoto, Zamfara and Kebbi

== History ==
- June 29, 1953: Established as Apostolic Prefecture of Sokoto from the Apostolic Prefecture of Kaduna
- June 16, 1964: Promoted as Diocese of Sokoto

== Special churches ==
The Cathedral is Holy Family Cathedral in Sokoto.

== Bishops ==
- Prefect Apostolic of Sokoto (Roman rite)
  - Father Edward Thaddeus Lawton, O.P. (1954.01.15 – 1964.06.16 see below)
- Bishops of Sokoto (Roman rite)
  - Bishop Edward Thaddeus Lawton, O.P. (see above 1964.06.16 – 1966.12.19)
  - Bishop Michael James Dempsey, O.P. (1967.07.13 – 1984.12.03)
  - Bishop Kevin Joseph Aje (1984.12.03 – 2011.06.10)
  - Bishop Matthew Hassan Kukah (since 2011.06.10)

=== Coadjutor bishop ===
- Kevin Joseph Aje (1982-1984)

== Persecution ==
Situated in the North of Nigeria, in a Muslim-majority atmosphere, there have been incidents of persecution in Sokoto against Christians and Catholics in particular. In May 2022, following the lynching of Deborah Yakubu, there was violence against other Christian sites, according to a statement released by the Catholic Diocese of Sokoto. "During the protest, groups of youths led by some adults in the background attacked the Holy Family Catholic Cathedral at Bello Way, destroying church glass windows, those of the Bishop Lawton Secretariat, and vandalized a community bus parked within the premises. St. Kevin’s Catholic Church was also attacked and partly burnt; windows of the new hospital complex under construction, in the same premises, were shattered. The hoodlums also attacked the Bakhita Centre […], burning down a bus within the premises.”

In 2022 two Catholic priests were kidnapped, and later released, in the diocese. Their names are Fr Stephen Ojapah and Fr. Oliver Okpara.

In June 2024 another priest, Fr. Mikah Suleiman was kidnapped. He was released on 7 July 2024.

== See also ==
- Roman Catholicism in Nigeria

== Sources ==
- GCatholic.org Information
- Catholic Hierarchy
- Nigerian Catholic Diocesan Priests Association page about Sokoto Diocese
- Dominican Sisters in Gusau, Zamfara State, Nigeria
