= Saint Augustine Major Seminary, Jos =

Catholic major seminary in Nigeria

Saint Augustne's Major Seminary (SAMS), Jos, Nigeria is a Catholic higher institution for the formation of Catholic priests. Established in 1967, it is the oldest major seminary in northern Nigeria and one of the prominent seminaries in the country. The seminary has graduated about 1,500 priests and produced 20 bishops. The current rector is Peter Hassan appointed in 2024 by Pope Francis.

== History ==
The seminary was established in 1967 at a temporary site in Keffi in the old Benue Plateau (the present day Nasarawa state) becoming the first major seminary in northern Nigeria. Prior to its establishment, northern candidates were trained at seminaries in the southern part of the country notably St. Peters and Paul Major Seminary, Bodija, Ibadan. Following the tensions generated by the 1966 military coups which created fears of possible attacks against northerners in the southern part of the country, establishment of St. Augustine Major Seminary became a matter of urgency.

The seminary began formation with 14 candidates, staffed and managed by the Irish Province of the Order of Saint Augustine from 1967 to 1984. Fr Tom Flynn was the inaugural rector of the school serving until 1984 when an indigenous priest, Fr Cletus Gotan took over as the rector.

The seminary moved from Keffi to another temporary site at Sabon Gwong in Jos, Plateau State before being finally moved to its permanent site in Laranto. The permanent site was a land designated for a cemetery but was repurposed and donated to the seminary by then Gbong Gwom Jos, Rwang Pam.

As of 2017, when the seminary celebrated its golden jubilee (50 years) of its existence, it had graduated 1,455 priests and has produced 20 bishops including Archbishop Ingnatius Kaigama and Mathew Hassan Kukah.
