= Christianah Oluwatoyin Oluwasesin =

Nigerian educator (1977–2007)

- Born: Ekiti
- Died: 2007
- Citizenship: Nigeria
- Occupation: Teacher

Christianah Oluwatoyin Oluwasesin (first name also given as Christiana, last name also as Oluwaseesin, Oluseesin or Olusesan), (Ekiti State, 1977 – Gandu, Gombe State, 21 March 2007), was a female Christian Nigerian teacher who was lynched by Yan Kalare boys for allegedly desecrating and mutilating the Qur'an at a secondary school in Gandu, Gombe State, Nigeria, on 21 March 2007.

Oluwasesin, a mother of two, was assigned to supervise an Islamic religious knowledge exam. When one of the students wanted to enter the exam hall with his books, Oluwasesin collected them and threw them outside. The students claimed that one of the books was a copy of the Qur'an. This caught the attention of the popular thugs (Yan Kalare), who stabbed her to death, even when another teacher showed that the books in question did not include a Quran. They then beat up the school principal, a Muslim, who later escaped the crowd for offering refuge to her. The mob also burned down three classroom blocks, the school clinic, the administrative block and the library.

== Aftermath ==
Gombe State Governor Mohammed Danjuma Goje ordered the immediate closure of all secondary schools in the state and the deployment of soldiers and policemen to strategic points in the state, especially churches. It was variously reported that between three and sixteen people were arrested in connection with the murder.. It was also reported that the sixteen young people ultimately arrested for the murder were all eventually released without penalty, and the case dismissed. This is similar to other cases in northern Nigeria were mobs have attacked victims for alleged infractions against Islam and escaped prosecution.
