= St. Rose Priory =

Historic church in Kentucky, United States

- St. Rose Roman Catholic Church Complex
- U.S. National Register of Historic Places
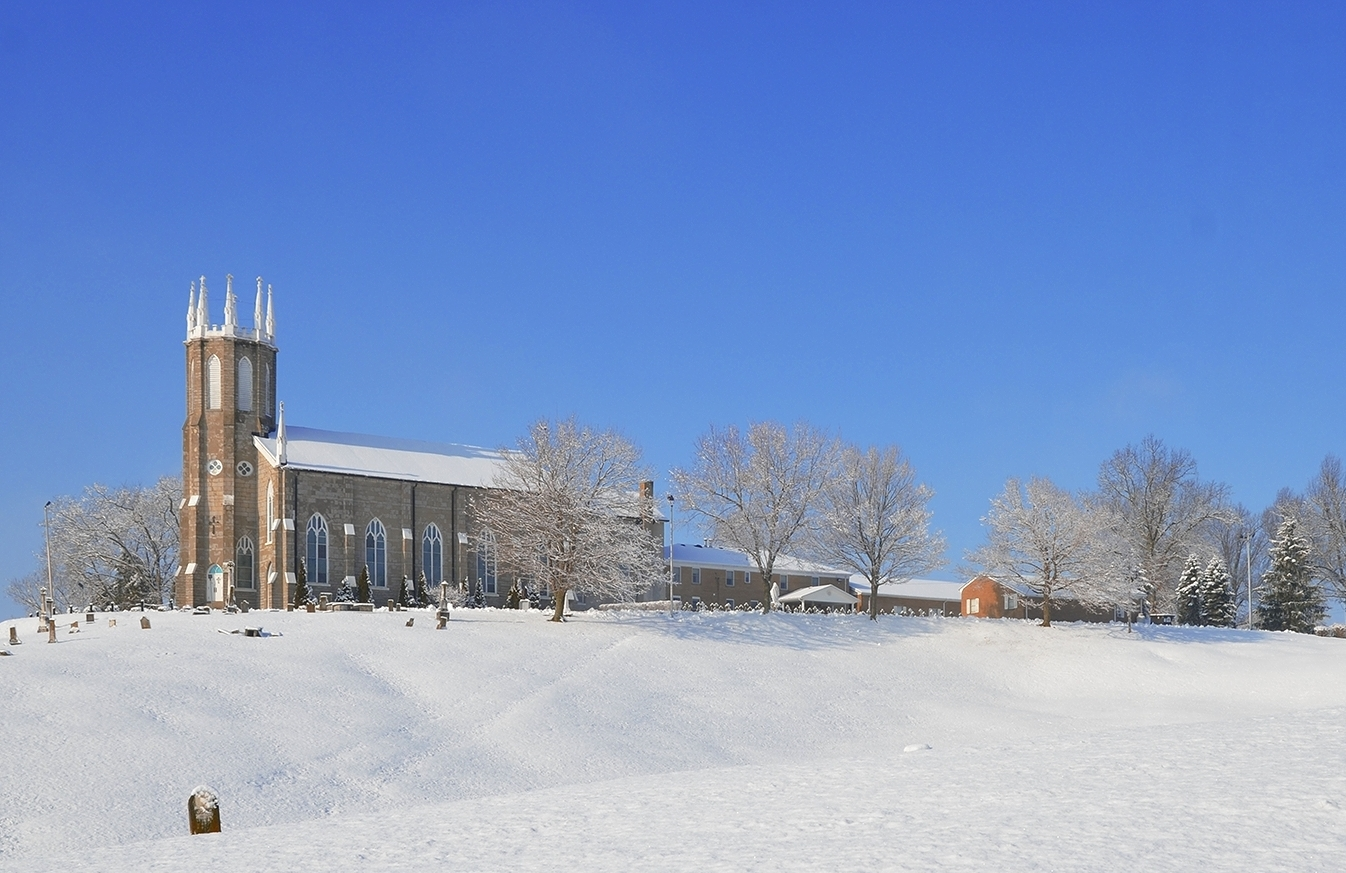
- St. Rose Catholic Church after a snowfall

- Location within Kentucky Location within the United States
- Location: one mile west on U.S. Highway 150 or two and one-half miles northwest from Springfield, Kentucky
- Nearest city: Springfield, Kentucky
- Coordinates: 37°41′36″N 85°15′49″W
- Built: 1852
- Architect: Keely, William
- Architectural style: Tudor Gothic
- NRHP reference No.: 78001413
- Added to NRHP: February 14, 1978

St. Rose Priory is a house of the Dominican Order located near Springfield, Kentucky. It is the first foundation of that Order in the United States, and the first Catholic educational institution west of the Allegheny Mountains.

The St. Rose Roman Catholic Church Complex including the priory, the church, and a guesthouse was listed on the National Register of Historic Places in 1978.

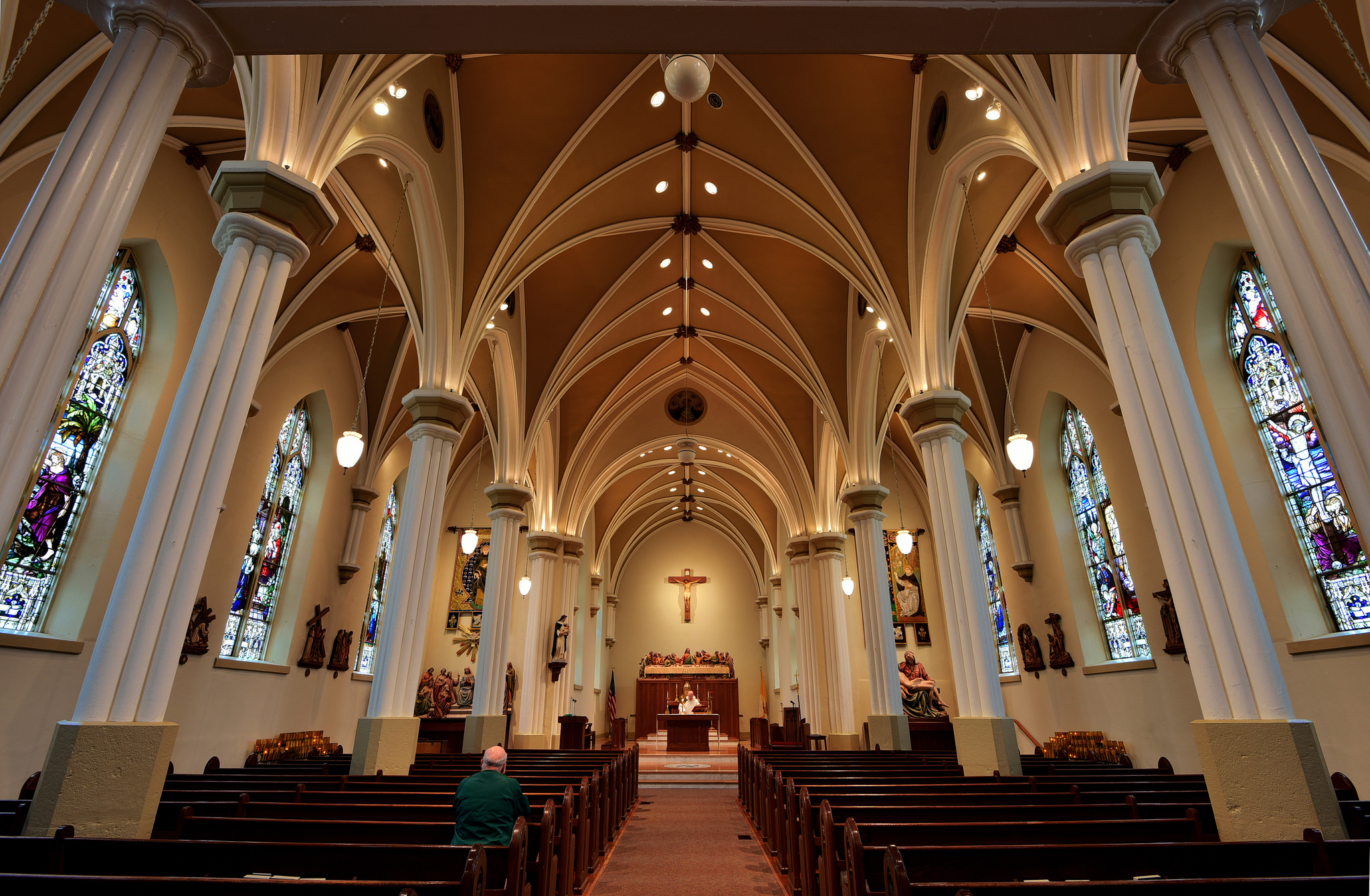
The present church interior during a Eucharistic adoration service.
