= Shia Islam in Nigeria =

Although the majority of the Nigerian Muslim population is Sunni, there is a small Shia minority, particularly in the northern states of Kano and Sokoto.

A 5% estimate for the Shia population in Nigeria is considered too high by demographic experts and religious researchers. Most rigorous independent sources, including the Pew Research Center, estimate the Nigerian Shia population at less than 5% (and closer to 1% to 2%) of the total Muslim population.

== Introduction of Shia in Nigeria ==
Shia faith was "almost unknown" in Nigeria until the 1980s, when Ibraheem Zakzaky introduced Shia Islam. Zakzaky's gained a following among those disenchanted with the political and religious establishment.

== Persecution ==
Members of the Nigerian Shia community have been persecuted in some cases, but in other cases have united with Nigerian Sunni in the Islamic Movement in Nigeria. Cleric Sheikh Ibraheem Zakzaky is a primary figure in the movement.

Saudi Arabia’s linked Sunni politicians, organizations and Nigerian security apparatus are behind the persecution of Shia Muslims in Nigeria. The Salafist movement Izala Society, is close to both Riyadh and Abuja and its satellite television channel Manara often broadcasts anti-Shiite sectarian propaganda.

The state government of Sokoto has reacted to the rise of Shia Islam in the state by taking such measures as demolishing the Islamic Center in 2007. Furthermore, clashes between Sunni and Shia residents followed the assassination of Salafi Imam Umaru Danmaishiyya, who was known for his fiery anti-Shia preaching.

In 2014, the Zaria Quds Day massacres took place, leaving 35 dead. In 2015, the Zaria massacre during which 348 Shia Muslims were killed by the Nigerian Army.

In April 2018, clashes broke out as Nigerian police fired teargas Shia protesters who were demanding the release of Sheikh Ibrahim Zakzaky, who had been detained for two years with no trial. The clashes left at least one protester dead and several others injured. Further, Nigerian police detained at least 115 protesters.

In October 2018, Nigerian military killed at least 45 peaceful Shia protesters. After soldiers began to fire, they targeted protesters fleeing the chaos. Many of the injured were shot in the back or legs. In July 2021, Shaikh Zakzaky has been acquitted of all charges and has been freed.

In August 2024, clashes between Shiite protesters and police in Abuja resulted in two police officers killed, an unknown number of injuries, and several vehicles burnt. The violence erupted during a procession by the Islamic Movement in Nigeria (IMN), a Shia Muslim group, marking the annual Ashura procession. IMN members were reportedly marching to the National Assembly when police attempted to disperse them. Witnesses claimed that the police fired teargas and live ammunition, sparking the violence. While, the IMN accused the police of unprovoked attack, the police claim protesters were armed and violent.

== See also ==
- Islamic Movement (Nigeria)
- Zaria Quds Day massacres
- Shia in Bahrain
