= Religion in Nigeria =

Religion in Nigeria (Pew Research Center 2020)
1. Islam (56.1%)
2. Christianity (43.4%)
3. Other (0.50%)
Religion in Nigeria (CIA World Factbook 2018)
1. Islam (53.5%)
2. Catholicism (10.6%)
3. Other Christians (35.3%)
4. Other religions (0.60%)

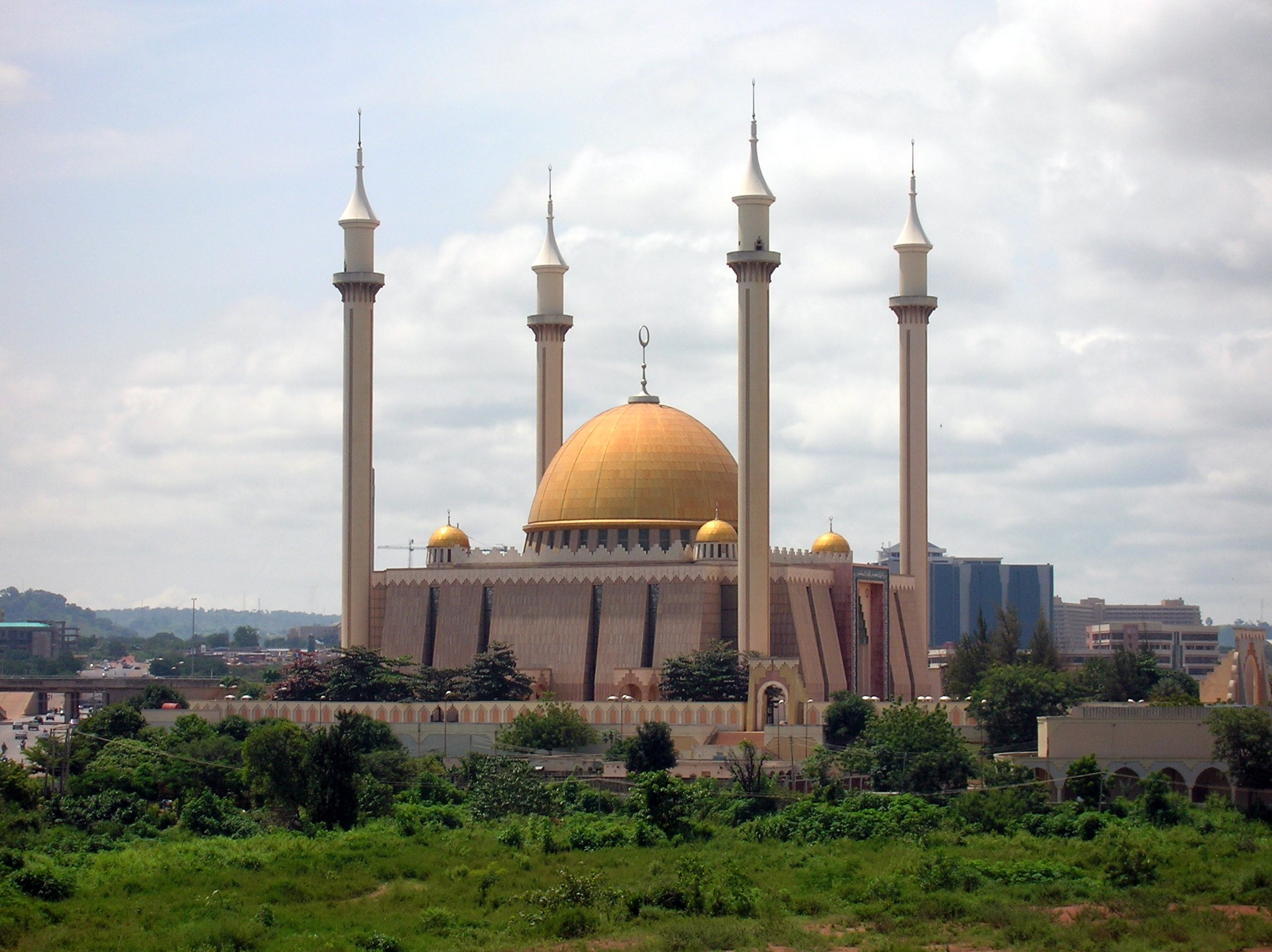
Abuja National Mosque

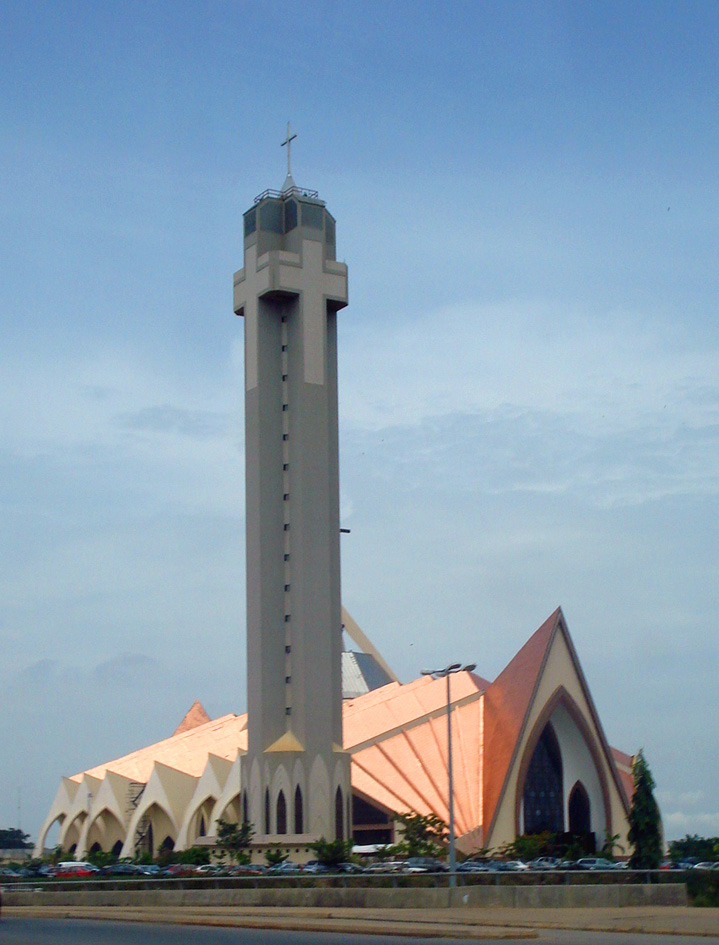
National Church of Nigeria

The Church and the Mosque face each other across Independence Avenue and Constitution Avenue in the national capital, Abuja.

Islam and Christianity are the two main religions practiced in Nigeria. The country is home to some of the world's largest Muslim and Christian populations, simultaneously. Nigeria is divided roughly in half with Muslims making up about 53% to 56% and Christians accounting for about 43% to 45% of the country's total population. The Christian share of Nigeria's population is currently in decline, due to a lower fertility rate relative to the Muslim population in the country. In 2020, Nigeria held the fifth largest Muslim population, and the sixth largest Christian population in the world.

The majority of Nigerian Muslims are either Sunni Muslims and are members of Sufi brotherhoods or Tariqa. Most Sufis follow the Qadiriyya, Tijaniyyah or Mouride orders. There is also a small Shia community (see Shia in Nigeria), as well as Ahmadiyya and Mahdiyya minorities. In terms of Nigeria's major ethnic groups' religious affiliations, the Hausa ethnic group in the north is almost entirely Muslim, and the Yoruba are religiously diverse, with most following either Christianity or Islam, though a significant number practice the Yoruba religion. Most Christians are Protestant (broadly defined), though about a quarter are Catholic. The Igbos of the east, the Ibibio, and Ijaw in the south are almost entirely Christians with a few practitioners of traditional religions. The Middle Belt region of Nigeria contains most of the minority ethnic groups and the most religious diversity in Nigeria as the region has a mix of Muslims and Christians, as well as members of traditional animist religions.

Nigeria is officially a secular state with no official state religion. Article 10 of the Constitution states that “The Government of the Federation or a State shall not adopt any religion as State Religion.” However, twelve Muslim-majority northern states have incorporated Sharia courts into their legal systems with the power and jurisdiction of these courts waxing and waning over the past two decades. In some of these states, sharia courts are optional arbitration courts for personal status issues whereas, in others, Sharia has effectively replaced the formerly secular state level legal system in both civil and criminal contexts. This has brought controversy due to its discriminatory practices towards religious and sexual minorities. Northern Nigeria has also been the site of the ongoing Boko Haram insurgency which has led to the death and displacement of tens of thousands of people.

== Religious demographics ==
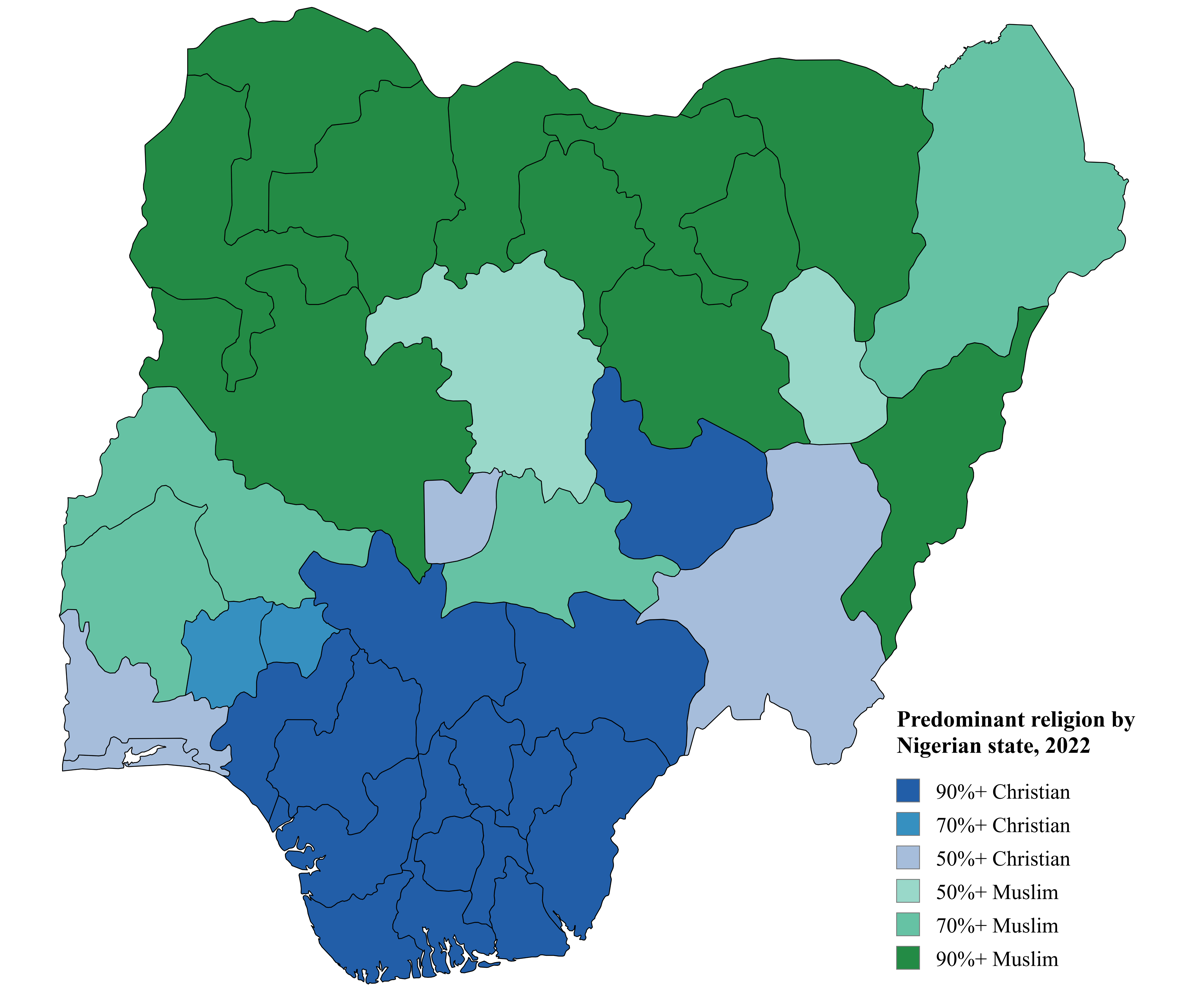
Predominant religion by Nigerian state according to the 2022 Afrobarometer survey

The 1963 Nigerian census, the last that asked about religion, found that about 47.2% of the population was Muslim, 34.3% Christian, and 18.5% other.

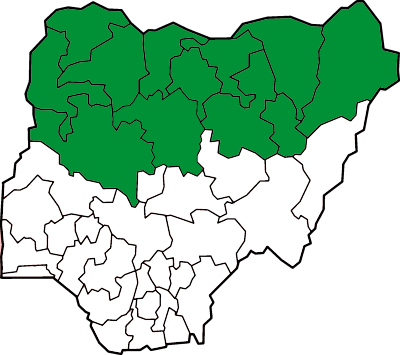
Nigerian states that implement some form of sharia law (in green)

Figures in the 2020 edition of The World Christian Encyclopedia draw on figures assembled and updated as part of the World Christian Database (WCD); these put those who identify as Christians at 46.3%, and Muslims at 46.2% and ‘ethnic religions’ at 7.2%. WCD figures predict that both Muslims and Christians will continue to grow as a proportion of the population through to 2050. Their projections predict Christians at that point will make up on 48% of the population and Muslims at 48.7%, both growing at the expense of ethnic religions, down to 2.9% of the population. Hsu et al. (2008) found that the WCD appears to overestimate Christian identification and cautioned against what seems to be uncritical acceptance of figures given by religious groups of their membership. The criticisms offered by Hsu et al. (2008) have been supported by evidence found by Nigeria Mckinnon (2020), which demonstrated that the WCD had substantially overestimated the Anglican proportion of the population.

The 2008 MEASURE Demographic and Health Survey (DHS) found 53% Muslim, 45% Christian, and 2% other; the 2008 Afrobarometer poll found 49% Christian, 50% Muslim, and 1% other; Pew's own survey found 52% Muslim, 46% Christian, and 1% other.

According to a 2018 estimate in The World Factbook by the CIA, the population is estimated to be 53.5% Muslim, 45.9% Christian (10.6% Catholic and 35.3% other Christian), and 0.6% as other. In a 2019 report released by Pew Research Center in 2015, the Muslim population was estimated to be 50% while the Christian population was estimated to be 48.1%. The Pew Forum in a 2010 report compared reports from several sources. In a 2020 projection based on 2010 estimate released by Pew Research Center, the Muslim population was estimated to be 51.1% while the Christian population was estimated to be 46.9% while the remaining 2% was other.

The 2020 estimate of Pew Research Center reported that Nigeria had a 56.1% Muslim majority while the Nigerian Christian minority numbered around 43.4%.

A 2022 Afrobarometer survey on religion in Nigeria found that, 54.2% of the respondents identified as Christian and 45.5% identified as Muslim. The remaining 0.3% of respondents in Nigeria said they identified with other or no religious beliefs.

The 2024 Nigeria Demographic and Health Survey (DHS) found that 57.7% of the 49,978 respondents identified as Muslim, 41.7% identified as Christian, and the remaining 0.6% practised other religions (including traditional beliefs and no religion).

A 2024 Afrobarometer survey found that 51.4% of the 1,600 respondents identified as Christian and 47.7% identified as Muslim, with the remaining 0.8% identifying with other faiths or no religion.

== Islam ==
Flag of the Northern Nigeria Protectorate (1900–1914).

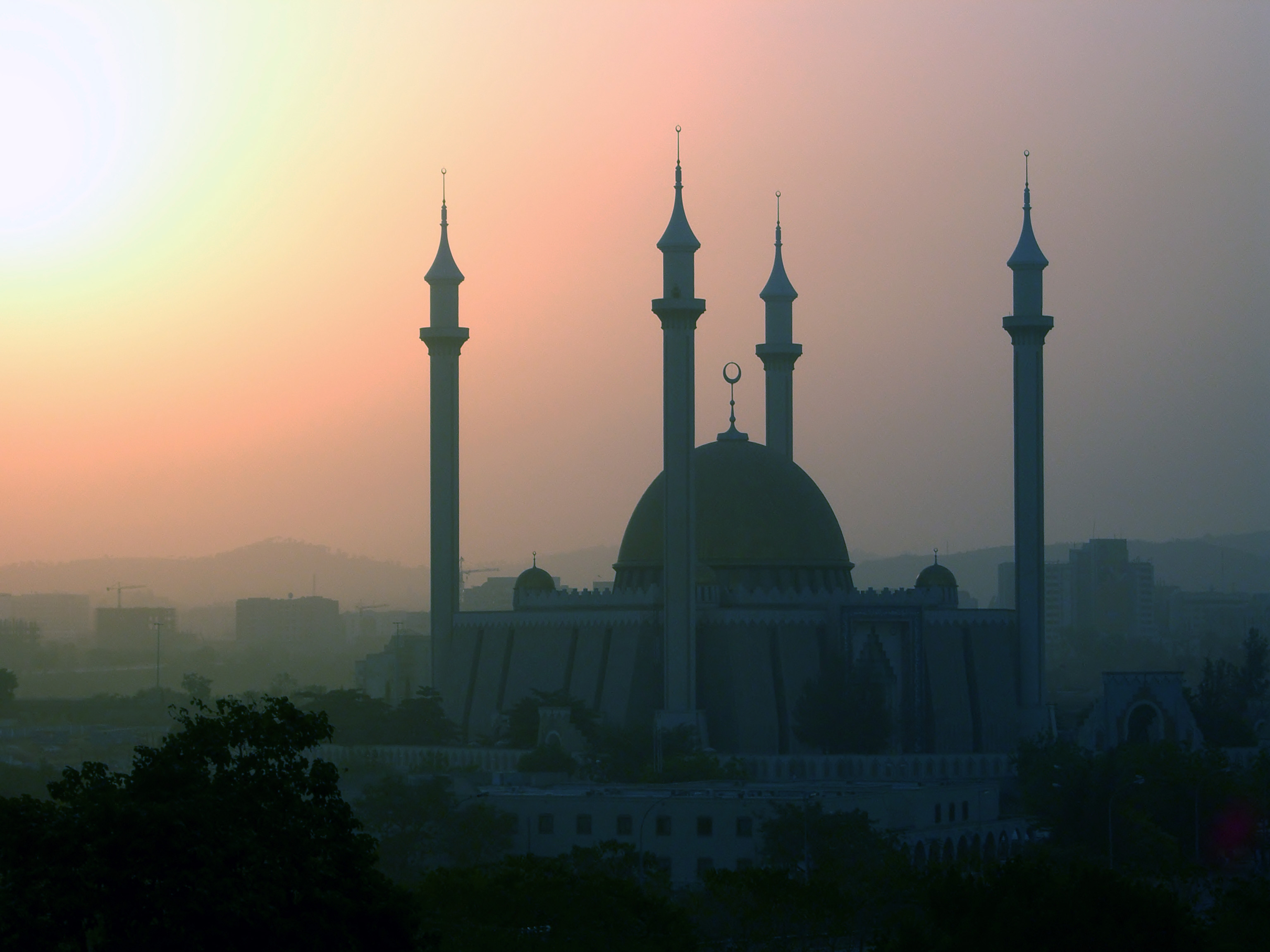
The mosque during Harmattan.

Nigeria has one of the largest Muslim populations in Africa. In Nigeria, about 52 percent of the population is Muslim. The Muslim population in Nigeria continues to grow. Estimates suggest 80-85 million Nigerians identify as Muslim (roughly 50% of the total population), of which the majority are probably Sunni (60 million), though this is not a unified identity and includes a wide variety of different viewpoints. For example, members of Sufi orders, members of the Jama‘atul Izalatul Bid’ah Wa’ikhamatul Sunnah (or Izala) movement, and members of Boko Haram might all identify as Sunni, but the Izala and Boko Haram movements have had strong anti-Sufi components.

In Nigeria, the most prominent existing Sufi orders are the Tijaniyya and Qadiriyya, and a 2012 Pew Research Center survey showed 37% of Nigerians identify with Sufi orders (19% identified specifically as Tijaniyya and 9% as Qadiriyya). The majority of the Muslim population in Nigeria live in the Northern, South western and Central states. Islam was introduced to northern and central Nigeria in the Middle Ages as early as the 11th century and was well established in the major capitals of the region by the 16th century, spreading into the countryside and toward the Middle Belt uplands. Shehu Usman dan Fodio established a government in Northern Nigeria based on Islam before the advent of European colonialism. The British colonial government therefore established indirect rule in Northern Nigeria based on the structure of this government. Islam also came to the South Western Yoruba-speaking areas during the time of Mansa Musa's Mali Empire.

The vast majority of Muslims in Nigeria are Sunni belonging to the Maliki school of jurisprudence; however, a sizeable minority also belong to the Shafi’i madhhab. Many Sunni Muslims are members of Sufi brotherhoods. Most Sufis follow the Kadiriyya, Tijaniyya or Mouride movements. Nigerian Islam has become heterogenous with the springing up of many Islamic sects. Notable examples are the Izala movement, the Shia movement, and many local Islamic sects that have limited expansion.

=== Shia ===
There are no accurate figures of Shias in Nigeria. According to independent sources like Pew Research Center Shias make up less than 5% of the Nigerian Muslim population. The Shia Muslims of Nigeria are primarily located in Sokoto State. Shia Muslims make up between two and four million of Nigeria's population. Ibrahim Zakzaky introduced many Nigerians to Shia Islam. The headquarter of Shia is Zaria where the leader lives with his family. The Shia Islamic Movement of Nigeria (IMN) was banned in Nigeria in 2019.

=== Sufi ===
Some Nigerian Muslims emphasize asceticism and mysticism and form Sufi groups called tariqas, orders, or brotherhoods. They commonly preach peaceful co-existence and do not sympathize with Islamic extremism. Most Nigerian Sufis follow the Qadiriyya, Tijaniyyah or Mouride movement.

=== Ahmadiyya ===
The Ahmadiyya movement established itself in Nigeria in 1916, and make up approximately 3% of the Muslim population. There are numerous Ahmadiyya centres in Nigeria including the Baitur-Raheem Mosque in Ibadan inaugurated in 2008, the Mubarak Mosque in Abuja, which is the last Ahmadiyya mosque, built in the first century of the Ahmadiyya Caliphate. Ahmadiyyas have also established a weekly newspaper called "The Truth" which is the first Muslim newspaper in the country.

=== Quraniyoon ===
The Kala Kato are a Nigerian group of Quranists. Their name means "a mere man said it" referring to the narrators of the sayings of Muhammad. The Kalo Kato rely entirely on the Quran and they are found among mostly lower-class communities across northern Nigeria.

=== Boko Haram and Darul Islam ===
Islam in Nigeria has witnessed a rise in the numbers of Islamic extremism notably among them, the Boko Haram, Maitatsine, Darul Islam among others.

These sects have sometimes resorted to the use of violence in a bid to realizing their ambitions on the wider Islamic and Nigerian populations as a whole.

The rise of these radical movements has been attributed partly to the poor socio economic infrastructures and poor governance in Nigeria. Poverty has been seen as the major catalyst leading to the rapid increase in the membership of these religious extremist groups. The rise of these sects has also been linked to the increase and aiding of religious extremist by politicians for their selfish ambitions. In recent times, there has been break out of religious crises in the ancient city of Kano with scores of Christians dead and their properties destroyed.

During the 1980s, religious riots occurred in and around the five cities of Kano in 1980, Kaduna in 1982, Bulum-Ketu in 1982, Jimeta in 1984 and Gombe in 1985. These riots were caused by the migration of the rural poor into urban towns during the dry seasons. An offshoot of Islam called the ‘Yan Tatsine’ violently rebelled against the authorities and non-members. These radical Muslims were inspired by Alhaji Mohammed Marwa Maitatsine. He was a Cameroonian preacher who slammed the government, something which led to his arrest in Nigeria in 1975, yet by 1972 many people followed him across society, ranging from the elite to Koranic students called almajiral or gardawa and unemployed migrants. Maitatsine and his followers became separate from orthodox Islam, condemning the corruption of the religious and secular elites and the wealthy upper classes’ consumption of Western goods during the petrol boom in 1974–81. The Boko Haram movement has been connected to the Maitatsine movement. They want to implement Sharia law across the whole of Nigeria.

== Christianity ==
Flag of the Southern Nigeria Protectorate (1900–1914).

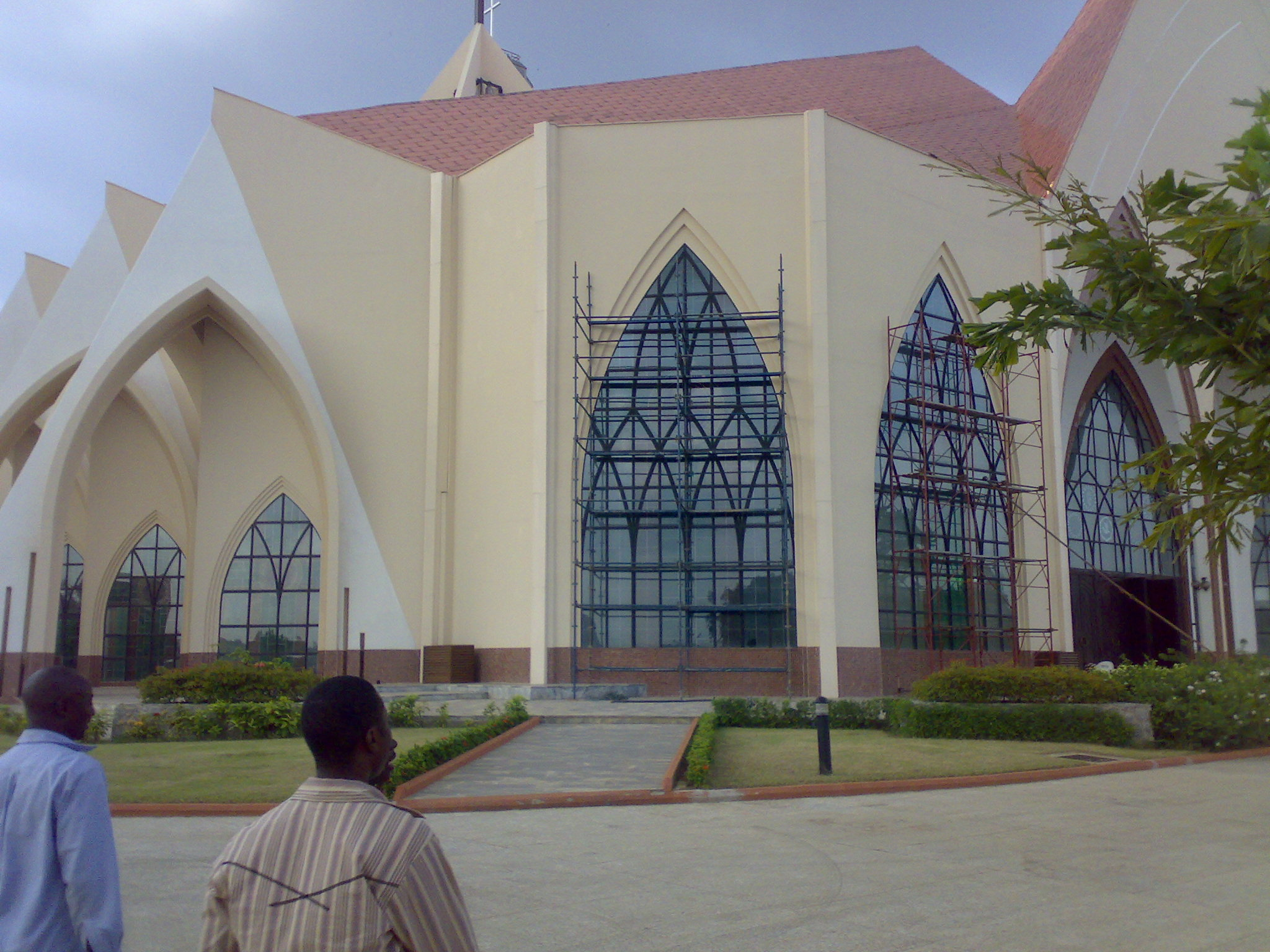
The National Church of Nigeria.

The history of Christianity in Nigeria can be traced back to the 15th century, when the Portuguese were the first Europeans to arrive on the shores of the region via the Atlantic. The Portuguese brought Catholic missionaries with them but failed to successfully plant the seed of Christianity. Most of the Portuguese bought Nigerian slaves from African slave traders to be resold in the Americas and parts of Europe. Hence, they were not fully committed to missionary work. In the 17th century, attempts were again made to establish Christianity in the region through more Catholic missionaries.

Nigeria has the largest Christian population in Africa according to Pew Research Center and it has the sixth largest Christian population in the world although the Christians in Nigeria are roughly about 40%-49.3% of the country's population. According to a 2011 Pew report, over 80 million Nigerians are Christians. Among Christians, about a quarter are Catholic, three quarters are Protestant, and about 750,000 belong to other Christian denominations and a few of them are Orthodox Christians. The majority of Nigeria's approximately 70 million Christians are either Catholic (at least 18.9 million) or Anglican (18 million), but a diverse group of Protestant churches also claim significant members, including Baptists (the Nigerian Baptist Convention claims 6 million worshipping members), Presbyterians, Assemblies of God, Methodists, the Evangelical Reformed Church of Christ, and what are known as the Aladura churches (Pentecostal and Spiritualist independent churches which emerged from the Anglican Church during colonialism).

The leading Protestant churches in the country are the Church of Nigeria of the Anglican Communion, The African Church, the Assemblies of God Church, the Nigerian Baptist Convention and The Synagogue, Church Of All Nations. The Yoruba area contains a large Anglican population, while Igboland is mainly Anglican and Catholic and the Edo area is predominantly Assemblies of God, which was introduced into Nigeria by Augustus Asonye and his associates at Old Umuahia.

The Nigerian Baptist Convention claims about three million baptized members.

From the 1990s to the 2000s, there was significant growth in Protestant churches, including the Redeemed Christian Church of God, Living Faith Church (Winners' Chapel), Christ Apostolic Church (CAC) (the first Aladura Movement in Nigeria), Deeper Christian Life Ministry, Evangelical Church Winning All, Mountain of Fire and Miracles, Christ Embassy, Common Wealth of Zion Assembly, Aladura Church (indigenous Christian churches being especially strong in the Yoruba and Igbo areas), and of evangelical churches in general. Also the Watchman Catholic Charismatic Renewal Movement was formed during this period with branches all over Nigeria. These churches have spilled over into adjacent and southern areas of the middle belt. Denominations like the Seventh-day Adventist also exist.

There are over 300,000 Early Pentecostal Apostolic Churches parishes in Nigeria having about 4.2 million adherents. Such denominations in this group are:

1. The Christ Apostolic Church,
2. The Apostolic Church,
3. The Celestial Church,
4. The Cherubim and Seraphim Church et cetera.

There are also about 380,000 New Apostolic Church parishes constituting about 6.5 million believers|New Apostolic Christians in Nigeria include: 1) The Redeemed Church, 4) Deeper Life Church, 5) Overcomers' Ministries and other new springs. By and large, Protestantism particularly the Pentecostals, Apostolic and evangelicals constitute the major Christian population of Nigeria from the late 1990s to the present.

The Church of Jesus Christ of Latter-Day Saints (LDS) announced creation of new Owerri mission in Nigeria in 2016.

Also, Nigerian pastors are rumored to be great in wealth.

=== Catholicism ===
The archdioceses of the Catholic Church in Nigeria are: Abuja, Onitsha, Jos, Benin City, Calabar, Ibadan, Lagos, and Owerri. It has about 19 million members in Nigeria in 2005. Cardinal Francis Arinze is a Catholic cardinal from Nigeria. In 2020, the pope appointed a Nigerian professor, Kokunre A. Agbontaen-Eghafona, to the Pontifical Academy of Social Sciences (PASS) in the Vatican.

=== Anglicanism ===
The ecclesiastical provinces of the Church of Nigeria are:

Lagos, Ibadan, Ondo, Bendel, The Niger, Niger Delta, Owerri, Abuja, Kaduna and Jos. Its primate is Nicholas Okoh. The Church of Nigeria has about 17 million members.

=== Christian distribution ===
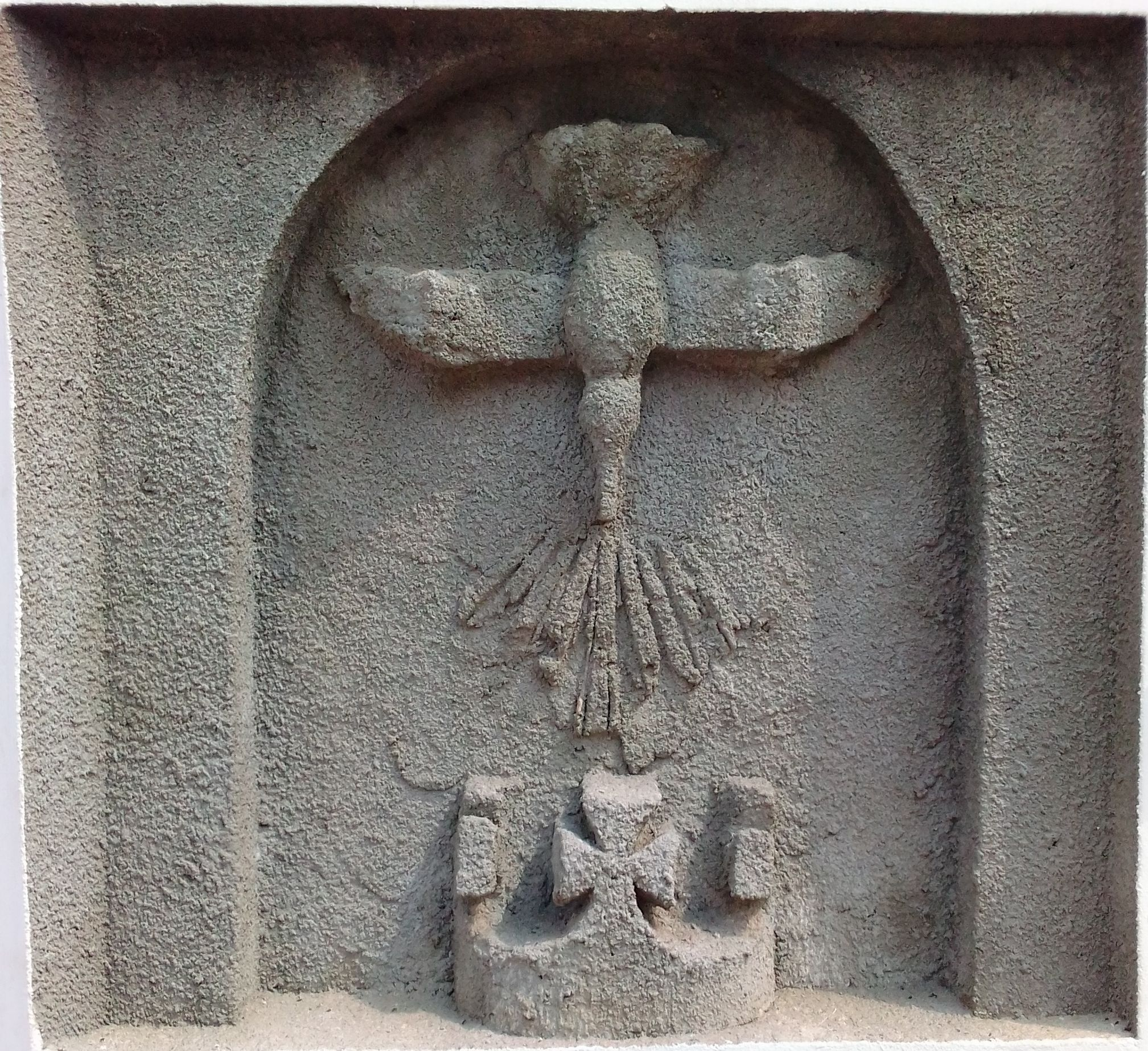
The Holy Ghost depicted on a relief in Onitsha

The largest ethnic groups in Nigeria are the Hausa-Fulani, the Yoruba, and the Igbo. Before the British colonization (1884), there were no inter-religious conflicts, Nigeria in its present borders did not exist as a single nation and the Muslim populations of northern Nigeria lived peacefully in mutual tolerance with the local animist and even Christian minorities. The British wanted to procure certain products, such as oil and palm nuts, and to introduce cotton cultivation, and they built railroads through the country with local labor starting in 1893. They administered the country indirectly, strengthening local elites when they were able to represent power.

The bulk of religious violence exists mainly in impoverished urban centers in the northern regions of the country, although coastal centers in the south are also prone to instances of political violence based on religious beliefs, as this is where the non-Hausa Christian minorities reside that are disfavored by the predominantly Hausa Muslim government. Non-Hausa groups residing in southern regions of Nigeria are marginalized by the republic, treated as second-class citizens, and denied their entitlements. The 1992 Zangon Kataf crises is one example of political violence in the south; when the local government announced markets would be moved out of southern Zango, riots erupted and thousands of people were killed as this was yet another instance of governmental discrimination that displaced the predominantly Christian locals.

The majority of Christians now are found in the south east, South-South, south west and Middle-belt region. It is estimated that around half the Nigerian population today are Muslim, while just under half are Christian. In northern urban centers, however, about 95% of the population is Muslim.

An increasing number of mission stations and mission bookstores, along with churches serving southern enclaves and northern Christians in the northern cities and larger towns, are found in the Muslim north. Christianity in Yoruba area traditionally has been Protestant (with a large number of them belonging to the Anglican church) along with Pentecostal/evangelicals, whereas Igboland has always been the area of greatest activity by the Catholic Church with current infusions of Protestantism. Other denominations abounded as well.

Presbyterians arrived in the late 17th century in the Ibibio, Annang and Efik land and the Niger Delta area and had missions in the middle belt as well. The works of the Presbyterian Church in Calabar from Scotland by missionaries like Rev Hope M. Waddell, who arrived in Calabar 10 April 1846, in the 19th century and that of Mary Slessor of Calabar are examples. Small missionary movements were allowed to start up, generally in the 1920s, after the middle belt was considered pacified. Each denomination set up rural networks by providing schooling and health facilities. Most such facilities remained in 1990, although in many cases schools had been taken over by the local state government in order to standardize curricula and indigenize the teaching staff.

Pentecostals arrived mostly as indigenous workers in the post-independence period, and in the 1980s, Evangelical and Apostolic Pentecostalism were spreading rapidly throughout the south western and middle belt, having major success in hitherto Catholic and Protestant towns of the south as well. There were also breakaway, or Africanized churches, that blended traditional Christian symbols with indigenous symbols. Among these was the Aladura movement that was spreading rapidly throughout Yoruba land and into the non-Muslim middle belt areas.

=== Missionary work ===
Apart from Benin and Warri, which had come in contact with Christianity through the Portuguese as early as the 15th century, most missionaries arrived by sea in the 19th century. As with other areas in African continent, Catholics and Anglicans each tended to establish areas of hegemony in southern Nigeria. After World War I, smaller denominations such as the Church of the Brethren (as Ekklesiyar Yan'uwa a Nigeria), Seventh-day Adventists and others worked in interstitial areas, trying not to compete. Although less well-known, African-American churches entered the missionary field in the 19th century and created contacts with Nigeria that lasted well into the colonial period. Also, during this period, Jehovah's Witnesses began their missionary work in Nigeria and soon spread throughout the country

=== Offshoots of European denominations ===
African churches were founded by small groups breaking off from the European denominations, especially in Yorubaland, where such independence movements started as early as the early 19th century—influenced by American and British missionaries in early 1900s and stimulated by the great revival of the 1930s. They were for the most part ritually and doctrinally identical to the parent church, although more African music, and later dance and dressage/vesture, entered and mixed with the imported church services. Notable among the new springs of 1930 were such Protestant Pentecostals as the Christ Apostolic Church—an offshoot of the US-based Faith Tabernacle Congregation which swept through the Western Region and complemented by the likes of the Celestial Church and the Cherubim and Seraphim Church which were indigenous autonomous springs. A number of indigenous denominations used Biblical references to support polygamy.

With political independence came African priests in both Catholic and Protestant denominations. Rituals and forms of worship were strictly those of the home country of the original missionaries. By the 1980s, African music and even dancing were being introduced quietly into western oriented church services, albeit altered to fit into rituals of Euro-American origin. Southern Christians living in the north, especially in larger cities, had congregations and churches founded as early as the 1920s.

Even medium-sized towns (20,000 persons or more) with an established southern enclave had local churches, especially in the middle belt, where both major religions had a strong foothold. The exodus of Igbo from the north in the late 1960s left Catholic churches poorly attended. By the 1980s adherents were back in even greater numbers, and a number of new churches had been built. The middle belt and the west and southwest of Nigeria remain the hold of Protestants (Pentecostal, evangelical and indigenous spring of Christian denominations).

=== Combination with traditional practices ===
The Aladura, like several other breakaway churches, stress healing and fulfillment of life goals for oneself and one's family. African beliefs that sorcery and witchcraft are malevolent forces against which protection is required are accepted; rituals are warm and emotional, stressing personal involvement and acceptance of spirit possession. Theology is biblical, but some sects add costumed processions and some accept polygyny.

=== Social class and religion ===
Major congregations of the larger Catholic and Anglican missions represented elite families of their respective areas, although each of these churches had members from all levels and many quite humble church buildings. Nevertheless, a wedding in the Anglican cathedral in Lagos was usually a gathering of the elite of the entire country, and of Lagos and Yorubaland in particular. Such families had connections to their churches going back to the 19th century and were generally not attracted to the breakaway churches. All major urban centers, all universities, and the new capital of Abuja had areas set aside for the major religions to build churches and mosques and for burial grounds.

== Traditional beliefs ==
Alongside the main religious groups, there are hundreds of traditional spiritualities of various Nigerian ethnic groups. Without contradicting civil law, they manage to govern ethics and morality amongst much of the population.

=== Yoruba ===
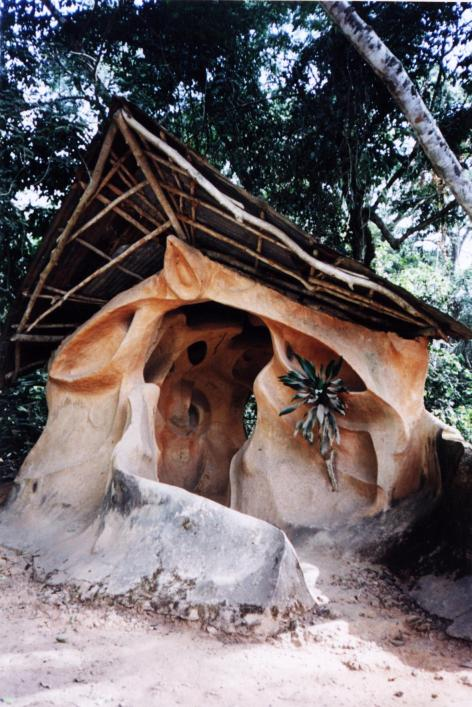
Ọṣun-Osogbo Sacred Grove, Nigeria

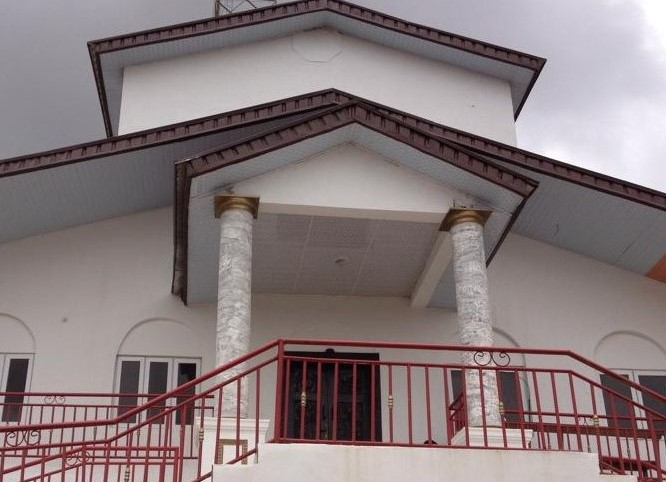
Ifá Temple, Ile-Ife

Each of the hundreds of ethnic groups in Nigeria have traditional belief systems, which still have millions of followers throughout the country. Among the Yoruba, the traditional Yoruba belief system, known as Ìṣẹ̀ṣe, revolves around the belief in a Supreme being known as Olodumare, a complex system of divination known as Ifá, as well as deities associated with nature known as orisha. Within the cities and subethnic groups of Yorubaland, traditions differ widely, but all are closely connected with nature, music, and historical roots of various towns. A more reserved way of life expresses a theology that links local beliefs to a centrally-placed government and its sovereignty over the neighborhood or communities through the monarch, the Ọba.

=== Practices ===
In addition to ensuring access to and the continual fertility of the land and the people, seasonal festivals act as a spectacle for "tourism" contributing to regional productivity. Meanwhile, the practices are not the same; they have some similarities and differences. The acts in a given traditional carnival is dependent on the type of gods or goddesses to be worshiped. While traditional festivals usually attracts tourists, fun seekers, and community people, it is also good to note that there are certain forbidden acts which prevent people from doing certain things, probably before and during the festivals.

"Society in general has more gradually and selectively expanded to accommodate new influences, it is fairly certain that they will continue to assert their distinctive cultural identity in creative and often ingenious ways".

== Other religions ==
=== Baháʼí Faith ===
After an isolated presence in the late 1920s, the Baháʼí Faith in Nigeria begins with pioneering Baháʼís coming to Sub-Saharan West Africa in the 1950s especially following the efforts of Enoch Olinga who directly and indirectly affected the growth of the religion in Nigeria. Following growth across West Africa a regional National Spiritual Assembly was elected in 1956. As the community multiplied across cities and became diverse in its engagements it elected its own National Spiritual Assembly by 1979 and Operation World estimated 1000 Baháʼís in 2001 though the Association of Religion Data Archives (relying mostly on the World Christian Encyclopedia) estimated some 34,000 Baháʼís in 2005.

=== Hinduism ===
Hinduism spread to Nigeria mainly by immigration of Hindus from India and of Hare Krishna Missionaries. Many Nigerians have converted to Hinduism mainly due to efforts of ISKCON Missionaries. ISKCON has inaugurated the Vedic Welfare Complex in Apapa.

Altogether including Nigerians of Indian origin and NRIs there are 250,000 Hindus in Nigeria. Most of them live in Lagos, the former capital of Nigeria.

=== Chrislam ===
Chrislam is a blend of Christianity and Islam that takes practices from both the Bible and the Quran. It hopes to quell religious feuds among Nigerians. The movement was pioneered by the Yoruba people in south-west Nigeria, as it is common to find (within one family) Christians and Muslims living happily together and celebrating each other's religious festivals.

=== The Grail Movement ===
Nigeria has become an African hub for the Grail Movement, inspired by the work of Abd-ru-shin, principally In the Light of Truth: The Grail Message.

The Grail Movement is not an organisation in the usual legal sense, but a collective term for all kinds of endeavours to spread the knowledge of the Grail Message and to utilise it in all walks of life.

The associating of adherents of the Grail Message creates the foundation and the outer setting for the holding of hours for the joint worship of God (Hours of Worship) and Grail Festivals.

Facilitating such hours for adherents and readers of the Grail Message is - besides the dissemination of the Grail Message - one of the main concerns of the international Grail Movement. The ideative field of activity with its Hours of Worship and Grail Festivals, lecture events, readings, discussion evenings, seminars, events for children and young people, art exhibitions, concerts and more besides, comprises the actual activity of the Movement.

=== The Reformed Ogboni Fraternity ===
A fraternity incorporating references and insignia from the original Ogboni, is based on ancient rites, usages and customs. Established in 1914 by the Ven. Archdeacon T. A. J. Ogunbiyi. Membership is open to all adults who embrace a non-idolatrous faith in God. The fraternity is headquartered in Lagos, Nigeria. In 1996 it had about 710 conclaves/Lodges or Iledi in Nigeria and overseas.

== Atheism ==
Irreligion in Nigeria (specifically the "non-religious") was measured at four percent of the population in 2012, with convinced atheists at one percent. As in many parts of Africa, there is a great amount of stigma attached to being an atheist in addition to institutionalized discrimination that leads to treatment as "second-class citizens."

In a 2010 poll by Pew Research Center 51% of Nigerian Muslims agreed with the death penalty for leaving Islam. In some parts of Nigeria, there are even anti-blasphemy laws.

In 2017, the Humanist Association of Nigeria gained formal government recognition after a 17-year struggle. This was followed by recognition of the Atheist Society of Nigeria, the Northern Nigerian Humanist Association and the Nigerian Secular Society.

== Inter-religious conflict ==
While religious conflict is not new in Nigeria's borders, in the 1980s serious outbreaks of violence between Christians and Muslims and between Muslims and the government occurred, mainly in the North. Subsequent decades have seen the problem worsen, and insurgencies and new conflicts arise. Several administrations at the federal level have made efforts to counter this, which are still ongoing.

Christians complain of widespread persecution, especially in the north and Middle Belt. In a speech in the European Parliament, in October 2022, bishop Wilfred Chikpa Anagbe, of the Diocese of Makurdi, compared the situation of Christians in his country to "nothing short of a Jihad clothed in many names: terrorism, kidnappings, killer herdsmen, banditry, other militia groups" and called on the international community to abandon what he termed a "conspiracy of silence" on the subject.

Catholic Archbishop Matthew Man-Oso Ndagoso sums up the situation facing Christians in the following way. "For the past 14 years the nation has been grappling with Boko Haram, mostly in the northeast. While we were grappling with that, we had the issue of banditry in the northwest. And while we were grappling with this, we had the issue of kidnappings for ransom, which is becoming more widespread. And while grappling with this we have the old conflict with the Fulani herders."

== Freedom of religion ==
Pew Research stated that in 2021 Nigeria had the highest levels of social hostilities involving religion ("actions by private groups or individuals that infringe on the freedom of religious groups").

In 2025, Freedom House rated Nigeria's religious freedom as 1 out of 4.

Nigeria is number seven on Open Doors’ 2025 World Watch List, an annual ranking of the 50 countries where Christians face the most extreme persecution.

== By state ==
- Religion in Abia State
- Religion in Adamawa State
- Religion in Akwa Ibom State
- Religion in Anambra State
- Religion in Bauchi State
- Religion in Bayelsa State
- Religion in Benue State
- Religion in Borno State
- Religion in Cross River State
- Religion in Delta State
- Religion in Ebonyi State
- Religion in Edo State
- Religion in Ekiti State
- Religion in Enugu State
- Religion in Gombe State
- Religion in Imo State
- Religion in Jigawa State
- Religion in Kaduna State
- Religion in Kano State
- Religion in Katsina State
- Religion in Kebbi State
- Religion in Kogi State
- Religion in Kwara State
- Religion in Lagos State
- Religion in Nasarawa State
- Religion in Niger State
- Religion in Ogun State
- Religion in Ondo State
- Religion in Oyo State
- Religion in Plateau State
- Religion in Rivers State
- Religion in Sokoto State
- Religion in Taraba State
- Religion in Yobe State
- Religion in Zamfara State
- Religion in Federal Capital Territory (FCT) State

== See also ==
- The Church of Jesus Christ of Latter-day Saints in Nigeria
- Igbo Jews
- Irreligion in Nigeria
