= Religion in Kaduna State =

Religion in Kaduna State is a secular state, with Christian, Muslim and some indigenous religious adherents. The Sharia is valid for the areas with a mainly Muslim population. The leader of the Sufi Tijaniyyah brotherhood is Sheikh Dahiru Usman, and Sheikh Ibraheem Zakzaky is the leader of the Shia Islamic Movement in Nigeria.

The Roman Catholic Archdiocese of Kaduna (1911 as Eastern Nigeria) with 89 parishes under Archbishop Matthew Man-oso Ndagoso (2007), and the suffragan Dioceses of Kafanchan (1995) with 53 parishes under Bishop Julius Yakubu Kundi (2019) and Zaria (2000) with 29 parishes (Bishop vacant since 2022), have their seat in the state.

The Evangelical Church Winning All (Ecwa) which has 21 DCCs and large congregations and churches like ECWA Goodnews High cost and ECWA English Service A.K.A Blueroof Sabon Tasha and many more.

An ecclesiastical province of Kaduna of the Church of Nigeria exists including the Dioceses of Kaduna (1954 as Northern Nigeria) led by Bishop Timothy Yahaya, also Archbishop of the Province since 2023, Ikara led by Bishop Yusuf Janfalan, Wusasa led by Bishop Ali Buba Lamido (former Archbishop of the Province) and Zaria (2007) led by Bishop Abiodun Ogunyemi (2017).

The Churches of Christ are present in the state.

Winners' Chapel, which has been founded by David Oyedepo, is a Megachurch in Kaduna City.

When the governor of Kaduna announced to introduce Sharia, violence in Kaduna City erupted.

== See also ==
- Kaduna
- Nigerian sectarian violence
