= Religion in Katsina State =

Religion in Katsina State of Nigeria is mainly Islam. The Sharia is valid in the entire state. Amina Lawal was sentenced to death by stoning for adultery in 2002, but was freed in 2004.

The Anglican Diocese of Katsina has its seat in the city of Katsina; the current bishop is Jonathan Bamaiyi. No Roman Catholic diocese has its seat in the state (Katsina State is included in the Diocese of Sokoto).

== See also ==
- Nigerian sectarian violence
