= Polygamy in Nigeria =

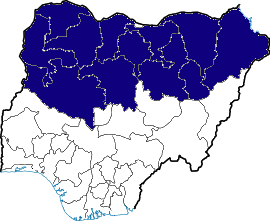
The 12 Muslim majority states in Nigeria's north where polygamy is legal.

Under civil law, Nigeria does not recognize polygamous unions. However, 12 out of the 36 Nigerian states recognize polygamous marriages as being equivalent to monogamous marriages. All twelve states are governed by Sharia law. The states, which are all northern, include the states of Bauchi, Borno, Gombe, Jigawa, Kaduna, Kano, Katsina, Kebbi, Niger, Sokoto, Yobe, and Zamfara, which allow men to take more than one wife.

Nigeria is part of the "polygamy belt", a region in West Africa and Central Africa where polygamy is common and deeply rooted in the culture. Nigeria is estimated to have the fifth highest polygamy prevalence in the world, with 28% of the population living in polygamous marriages, with only four countries (Burkina Faso, Mali, Gambia and Niger) having a higher prevalence.

== Legality ==
Zamfara State was the first to legislate polygamy, which occurred on January 7, 2000. Gombe State has been the most recent state to provide for civil polygamy, legalizing it on December 14, 2001.

As the southern region of Nigeria is predominantly Christian, polygamous marriages have not been legally introduced at this time. Attempts to introduce Sharia (thereby legalizing polygamy) have been made in Oyo State, Kwara State, Lagos State, and several others, but all have been unsuccessful. Polygamous unions are recognized by customary law in Nigeria, providing a handful of benefits for those in polygamous unions ranging from inheritance rights to child custody.

As of 2009, there has yet to be any debate of introducing a measure that would allow for civil polygamous marriages to be recognized nationwide, rather than allowing legislation to remain on a state-by-state basis. There are an estimated forty million polygamists in Nigeria.

== Dynamics ==
There are no requirements based on religion in the North, therefore Christians are legally allowed to form polygamous unions just as Muslims may do. Christian church leaders such as Archbishop Peter Akinola of the Anglican Church of Nigeria have condemned the practice of polygamy by Christians, with Akinola going on to write "The observation [of polygamy] will destroy our witness if not firmly addressed. We cannot claim to be a Bible-believing church and yet be selective in our obedience." Reports of Nigerian Mormons practicing polygamy have also surfaced.

Despite the four-wife limitation, there have been numerous indications that many Nigerians bypass this law, such as with Muhammadu Bello Masaba, an 84-year-old Islamic cleric who was accused of illegal marriage due to his exceeding number of spouses, in which he had 86 wives. The charges were later withdrawn by the Niger State Sharia commission, with Masaba able to retain all of his spouses.

On an opposite note, it was reported in April 2007 that a Nigerian lesbian, Aunty Maiduguri, married four women in an elaborate ceremony in Kano State, though her union is not recognized by the government, and Maiduguri and her partners were forced to go into hiding shortly after the ceremony to avoid the possible threat of being stoned if convicted for lesbianism, which results in capital punishment for married Muslim women or caning for single Muslim women in Nigerian areas under Sharia law.

=== Effects on children ===
In most polygamous households, parents have little time and money to devote to their children. Therefore, children from these homes beg on the streets to meet their basic requirements, including food, clothes, and shelter. Research in Gombe in 2017 found that children from monogamous families are happier than their counterparts in polygamous families. This accounted for 75.9% of the total responses. The daughters of poor parents are most neglected since neither formal nor Islamic kinds of education are given to them. Most of them end up being married off at age 12 and become teen mothers with negative health effects.

== States where polygamy is legally recognized ==
=== Bauchi ===
Bauchi State has been the most recent Nigerian state to legislate civil recognition of polygamous marriages for its citizens, which was established after the implanting of Islamic Sharia law on July 1, 2001. Polygamy among the impoverished make up a large portion of the population in Bauchi State. Polygamous unions and the large households they create contribute significantly more to child poverty than smaller monogamous households. Though polygamy and early marriages are customary, they have raised fertility rates and brought about increased poverty and insecurity. The increased fertility rates brought about by the legalisation of polygamy have overwhelmed already lacking resources. As families do not have the resources to educate their children, especially girls, these girls are married young, usually around age 12. This then fosters a cycle in which girls get married and have children young that cannot be provided for, then the daughters of those girls get sent off to get married and have children young, thus perpetuating a cycle of poverty.

=== Borno ===
Polygamy is regularly practiced in Borno State as one of the states in which it is legally permissible. It is also believed that monogamous marriages as a norm is a colonial concept, and by participating in polygamous unions, husbands and wives are battling that concept.

=== Gombe ===
Polygyny is permitted under Islamic law in Gombe, with the objective of sustaining proper social order and wellbeing in the community. However, despite Islamic law permitting up to four wives, a survey taken in Gombe in 2017 showed that the majority of men limited themselves to two wives.

Despite the fact that 83% of the surveyors were married in polygynous families, only 11.6% of the men had a third wife and 3.6% of the men had a fourth. Additionally, only 13.4% of the wives agreed that their husbands treated all wives equally, which contradicts Islamic law. Moreover, 47.2% of co-wives stated remained cordial with other co-wives, citing favoritism by the husband as the source of disagreements.

=== Jigawa ===
Jigawa state is governed by Sharia law, which allows a man to have more than one wife. The 2018 DHS found that 44.7% of women in Jigawa state were in polygamous unions.

=== Kaduna ===
Polygamous marriage is a prevalent social structure in Kaduna state. A survey taken in Zaria, Kaduna in 2024 shows that communication and quality time are important to preserving a healthy relationship. They also stated that “Making joint decisions through open and respectful communication.” is important in a marriage, which may contradict other viewpoints of men as sole decision-makes. However, a large portion of conflict that takes place comes from financial constraints, with the majority of participants agreeing that their partner is not completely transparent about family finances, and how conflict can arise if spouses and children are not taken care of.

=== Kano ===
A large reason for polygamy in Kano has to do with a preference for the number or sex of children. Even though the woman does not necessarily have biological input on that, a man my take another wife in hopes that she would birth a child of a different sex. In a 2017 survey it was found that wives show a 20% higher preference for having sons than their husbands, as providing male children may lead to more marital security.

=== Katsina ===
In focus group discussions taken place in Katsina in 2011, it was found that husbands tend to split their days with co-wives evenly. However, the wives may negotiate different days between each other depending on their ovulation periods. Consequently, in a 2019 survey on marital jealousy in Hausa Muslim women in Katsina, 26% of the respondents classed their jealousy levels as high (20%) or very high (6%). 37% of the respondents stated that their reason for jealousy was sharing a husband, and 15% of the respondents admitted to checking their husband’s phone. This is usually due to the fact that the husband spends two days each with each wife. The first wife loses the monopoly on days that she previously had, leading to jealousy.

=== Kebbi ===
Just post independence, a third of males reported being in a polygamous marriage and 54-60% of women reported being in polygamous unions. Marriage order was relevant, but only particularly in unions with 3-4 wives. Additionally, during this time, divorce was frequent so a woman’s position in the marriage was constantly changing. However, in a 2021 survey of female homestead farmers 62.5% of respondents reported living in households of 6-10 people and 20.8% reported living in households of 11-15 people. Most of the respondents were from polygamous households in rural areas, created in order to increase farming labour.

=== Sokoto ===
Currently, just under 40% of marriages in Sokoto state are polygamous unions. In a study on power in polygynous marriages in Northern Nigeria, most respondents had 2 wives, and few had the 4 they were allowed to have. Most of the men (all aged over 40 and in polygynous marriages) stated that when making decisions, they may listen to their wives' input, but ultimately base all decision-making on personal preferences. When it came to time sharing, many followed a two-day rotation per wife, while others preferred a more flexible approach. The study showed that though male decision-making aimed to increase household stability, it had the potential to lead to dissatisfaction among wives, especially those feeling neglected. However, a study among monogamous and polygamous women in rural areas of Sokoto state showed no significant statistical difference in rates of depression among women in different types of marriages. Though 15.1% of the polygamous women attributed their sadness to the fact that their husbands prioritised their co-wives. Additionally, there was a 17.8% increase in women who were dissatisfied with their husbands’ taking care of their children in polygamous unions.

=== Zamfara ===
After the adoption of Sharia Law in Zamfara State in early January 2000, Zamafara State became the first state in Nigeria to allow for legal recognition of polygamous marriage under civil law, as such is practicable under Sharia, which allows for a man to take up to four wives on the account that he treats them equally. Mahmud Shinkafi, the governor of Zamfara State, has two wives.

After Zamfara State established Sharia which brought about polygamy, numerous other states such as Kano State soon followed suit, thereby legalizing polygamy. While the Government of Nigeria only recognizes a monogamous marriage under civil law, recognizing polygamous unions with similar benefits under customary law, states that impose Sharia are not affected by such and therefore can provide polygamy for their citizens.

== States where polygamy is not legally recognized ==
=== Kwara ===
Since the introduction of Sharia law throughout northern Nigeria, various attempts have been made to implant Sharia law into the southern Kwara State, which would legalize polygamy. Polygamous unions are currently recognized under customary law throughout Nigeria, but lack numerous benefits in a Nigerian civil marriage. While civil marriage in Nigeria is monogamous, a dozen states and counting have implanted Sharia into their legal systems and thus are exempt. While the implanting of Sharia was unsuccessful, numerous Sharia courts were set up in Kwara State to serve for Muslim legal cases. Sharia has yet to be introduced to the entire state as the governing legal system.

=== Lagos ===
Polygamous marriages are not permitted as of 2010 in Lagos State, which has Nigeria's most populous city, Lagos. Attempts to introduce Sharia law in Lagos State, thereby legalizing polygamy, have been made since early 2002, after a dozen of Nigeria's northern states established Sharia as the governing form of law for Muslims, but not non-Muslims, in these states. The city of Lagos currently has a Sharia court that pertains to civil and legal matters concerning Muslims in the city, though the state does not recognise its rulings as binding, much like the Sharia court in the United Kingdom.

=== Nasarawa ===
Currently, Nasarawa State does not provide for polygamous marriages, though the status could possibly change. Since the legislation of Sharia law in a dozen of Nigeria's northern states, the debate of legislating Sharia in Nasarawa State soon entered the political arena, sparking both outrage and excitement from the residents of Nasarawa State. The introduction of such a measure failed, but was revived in mid July 2005.

Supporters have vowed to continue their attempts to implant Sharia into the state. The state remains one of the few states in Nigeria's north that is not governed by Sharia Law, possibly due to the large Christian population. While Sharia law is currently not implanted, there is a Sharia court that operates in the state, though pertains to Muslims only.

=== Oyo ===
Since May 2002, attempts have been made to implant Sharia law into the southern Oyo State, which would legalize polygamy. Polygamous unions are currently recognized under customary law throughout Nigeria, but lack numerous benefits in a Nigerian civil marriage. While civil marriage in Nigeria is monogamous, a dozen states have implanted Sharia into their legal systems and thus are exempt. While the implanting of Sharia was unsuccessful, numerous Sharia courts were set up in Oyo State to serve for Muslim legal cases. Sharia has yet to be introduced to the entire state as the governing legal system.

=== Plateau ===
Plateau State currently does not recognize polygamous marriages under civil law. Efforts to introduce Sharia law in Plateau State have not been successful due to strong opposition by the largely Christian population. As of 2018, Sharia law has not been implanted into the state's legal codes.

== See also ==
- Child marriage in Nigeria
- Religion in Nigeria
- Sharia in Nigeria
