= Irreligion in Nigeria =

Irreligion in Nigeria (specifically the "non-religious") was measured at four percent of the population in 2012, with convinced atheists at one percent. As in many parts of Africa, there is a great amount of stigma attached to being an atheist in addition to institutionalized discrimination that leads to treatment as "second-class citizens."

In a 2010 poll by Pew Research Center 51% of Nigerian Muslims agreed with the death penalty for leaving Islam. In some parts of Nigeria, there are even anti-blasphemy laws.

In 2017, the Humanist Association of Nigeria gained formal government recognition after a 17-year struggle. This was followed by recognition of the Atheist Society of Nigeria, the Northern Nigerian Humanist Association and the Nigerian Secular Society.

== List of non-religious Nigerians ==
- Bisi Alimi
- Leo Igwe
- Seun Kuti
- Seun Osewa
- Mubarak Bala
- Tai Solarin
- Wole Soyinka
- Marcel Ichie Nnaemeka

== See also ==
- Religion in Nigeria
- Christianity in Nigeria
- Islam in Nigeria
- Demographics of Nigeria
- Sharia in Nigeria
