= Religion in Zamfara State =

Overview of religion in Zamfara State, Nigeria

The largest Religion in Nigeria's Zamfara State is Islam. Sharia law is in effect throughout Zamfara, and no Roman Catholic diocese has its seat there. On 28 October 1999, Governor Ahmed Sani Yerima declared Sharia Law would govern in Zamfara.

Shari'a is the Islamic code of law that for centuries has provided a complete guide to life of Muslims. The argument however is that Nigeria is made an equal distribution of Christian and Muslims so the implication of imposing the law was detrimental to the non-Muslims. The question of its legality was considered as it was seen to be against the constitution.

== See also ==
- Nigerian sectarian violence
- Sharia in Nigeria
