= Religion in Gombe State =

Religion in Gombe State consists of the religious belief practices of people living in Gombe State, as well as their history. According to a 2015 estimate, the population of Gombe State about 65-70% Muslim and 30-35% Christian without accounting for traditionalist practices, other faiths, or irreligion. Sharia is valid for the Muslim population.

Geographically, Muslims predominate in the northern and central regions of the state while the southern region is majority-Christian; however, there are sizeable minorities of northern Christians and southern Muslims. In terms of ethnicity, the Bole, Fulani, Kanuri, and Hausa peoples in the state are almost entirely Muslim while Tangale, Pero, Waja peoples are predominantly Christian. Groups like the Cham, Dadiya, Jara, Kamo, Tera peoples are religiously mixed while non-indigenous groups like the Igbo people tend to be mainly Christian.

In the late nineteenth century, Gombe was known to be a starting point of religious crises in Northern Nigeria. To address and mitigate this, the Nigerian Supreme Council for Islamic Affairs (NSCIA) and the Christian Association of Nigeria (CAN) formed a forum called the Nigeria Inter-Religious Council (NIREC) in 1999 for the purpose of tackling the issues. In the twenty-first century, religious conflicts between Christians and Muslims lessened but still occasionally flare up, notably clashes over Sharia implementation in 2000 and 2001, the lynching of Christianah Oluwatoyin Oluwasesin in 2007, and the 2021 Mai Tangale crisis in addition to clashes between Islamic Movement of Nigeria and law enforcement, Boko Haram attacks on churches, and religiously tinged electoral violence.

== See also ==
- Nigerian sectarian violence
