= Cornelius Bello =

Anglican bishop in Nigeria

Cornelius S S Bello was an Anglican bishop in Nigeria: he was the Bishop of Zaria, one of ten dioceses within the Anglican Province of Kaduna, itself one of 14 provinces within the Church of Nigeria.

He was Bishop of Zaria until 2017 when he retired and was replaced by Abiodun Ogunyemi.
