= Religion in Kano State =

Overview of religion in the Nigerian state

Religion in Kano State of Nigeria is dominated Islam. Sharia is valid throughout the entire state. The Roman Catholic Diocese of Kano has its seat in the state. It is stated in Kano State that there is freedom to practice Christianity in Kano State. This claim was recently challenged when the Governor of Kano State publicly converted an underage minor to Islam. In 2022, Mubarak Bala, the president of Humanist Association of Nigeria, was sentenced to 24 years in prison for comments he made on social media about Islam.

== See also ==
- Nigerian sectarian violence
