= Religion in Sokoto State =

Religion in Sokoto State of Nigeria is mainly Islam. The Sharia is valid in the entire state. The Roman Catholic Diocese of Sokoto has its seat in the state. The Churches of Christ are present in the state.

== See also ==
- Nigerian sectarian violence
