= Abd-ru-shin =

German writer (1875-1941)

Abd-ru-shin/Abdruschin
- Born: Oskar Ernst Bernhardt; 18 April 1875; Bischofswerda, Kingdom of Saxony, German Empire
- Died: 6 December 1941 (aged 66); Kipsdorf, Saxony, Germany
- Other names: Abd-ru-shin, Abdruschin, Abdrushin
- Occupation: Author
- Known for: In the Light of Truth: The Grail Message
- Website: Abd-ru-shin

Oskar Ernst Bernhardt, also known as Abd-ru-shin or Abdruschin (18 April 1875 – 6 December 1941) was a German religious leader, best known as the author of The Grail Message and as prophet and leader of the Grail Movement, a millenarian new religious movement. Beginning in the 1920s, Abd-ru-shin proclaimed that the Millennial kingdom of God would begin on Earth during the mid 1930s, drawing from Christian legend, as well as Theosophy and other Western Esotericism.

== Life, publishing, legacy ==
Bernhardt was born in Bischofswerda, in the Kingdom of Saxony, part of the German Empire, in 1875, to a innkeeping family. He trained in business, graduating from a business school. Bernhardt established his own business in 1897 and got married, but was accused of fraud on separate occasions by his mother in law and former business partners, and spent 13 months in prison. From around 1900, he traveled and wrote travel books, stories, and plays, with his plays becoming somewhat popular. He was separated from his wife and children and living London when World War I broke out (having recently returned from a business trip to New York) and in 1915 he was interned by the British Government on the Isle of Man due to his German nationality. He was released in the spring of 1919 and returned to Germany. He likely first began to formulate his religious ideas during his internment. On Good Friday 1923, Bernhardt proclaimed that Jesus "came down to the Earth in order to transfer his task of the Mediator between God and mankind to the Son of Man." He began to write the religious writings of what ultimately become In the Light of Truth: The Grail Message beginning in 1923 and completed it in 1931. From 1924 he used the pen name "Abd-ru-shin" (originally "Abdruschin") of allegedly Persian-Arabic origin, which Bernhardt originally interpreted as meaning "The Son of the Holy Spirit", but which many later authors have translated as "Son of Light". Bernhardt claimed to be the Messiah or Son of Man, and fortold an imminent coming of God's Kingdom on Earth in the mid 1930s.

In his own book he presented himself (his own message) as "the last helping hand extended to humanity right before the world's end", i.e. after Jesus Christ failed in his salvific mission almost two thousands years beforehand.

In 1928, he settled in an estate at Vomperberg, Tyrol. By the end of the 1920s Bernhardt had managed to attract a following of several thousand people, primarily Germans, Austrians, Swiss and Czechs. At Vomperberg, Berhardt developed a settlement for his followers. In 1936, Abd-ru-shin was arrested "because of infractions of currency laws". The Nazis arrested Abd-ru-shin in 1936 on the grounds of illegal foreign exchange from Germany to Austria. It turns out that this operation was carried out in absentia, over his head, by two leaders of the Community. Therefore, he was unaware of anything and did not give his consent to this action. Records confirm that Abd-ru-shin had given an express order to his collaborators, that they should always strictly follow all legal requirements. Abd-ru-shin was arrested on that occasion without knowing anything about what was happening. Months later, he was declared innocent and released. The settlement ended when the Nazis got angry at him. Many of his former members were also angry with him. In 1938, Abd-ru-shin was arrested after Austria came under German occupation.

He was described in newspapers as the Messiah of the Tyrol and the Prophet of Vomperberg. He admitted in the Grail Message that the "leading newspapers" did describe him so. Certain strands of the Grail Movement consider Abd-ru-shin's wife Maria and her daughter divine as well.

Bernhardt died in 1941, without his prophecy being fulfilled. Bernhardt's followers would rationalise the failure of the prophecy following his death by suggesting that the date of the coming of God's kingdom is unknowable. After the war, his family returned to Vomperberg and carried on his work leading the Grail Movement.

Other writings by Abd-ru-shin published by Grail Foundation Press include The Ten Commandments of God and The Lord's Prayer, Questions and Answers, and Prayers.

== See also ==
- List of messiah claimants
- Messiah complex

== Bibliography ==
- Kurt Hutten: Seher - Grübler - Enthusiasten. 1997, ISBN 3-7918-2130-X, S. 531–549
- Helmut Obst: Apostel und Propheten der Neuzeit – Gründer christlicher Religionsgemeinschaften des 19. und 20. Jahrhunderts. 4., stark erweiterte und aktualisierte Auflage. Vandenhoeck & Ruprecht, Göttingen 2000, ISBN 3-525-55438-9
- Andreas Plagge: "Bernhardt, Oskar Ernst". In: Biographisch-Bibliographisches Kirchenlexikon (BBKL). Band 22, Bautz, Nordhausen 2003, ISBN 3-88309-133-2, Sp. 120–122, .
- Georg Schmid: Kirchen, Sekten, Religionen. 2003, ISBN 3-290-17215-5, S. 219–221
- Gassmann, Lothar [in German] (1999). Zukunft - Zeit - Zeichen: Aufruf zur Wachsamkeit (PDF) (in German). Lahr: VLM, Verl. der Liebenzeller Mission. ISBN 978-3-88002-694-0. Archived from the original (PDF) on 19 October 2016.
- Patrick Diemling: Neuoffenbarungen Religionswissenschaftliche Perspektiven auf Texte und Medien des 19. und 20. Jahrhunderts, Universitätsverlag Potsdam, 2012,.
