= Religion in Bauchi State =

Religion in Bauchi State of Nigeria is mainly Islam and Christianity. The Sharia is valid in the entire state. The vast majority of the state's population (~80%) are Muslim with smaller Christian and traditionalist minorities at about 15% and 5%, respectively. Evangelicals are the dominant Christian branch in the state, but there are also adherents of the Roman Catholicism and Anglicanism. The Roman Catholic Diocese of Bauchi has its seat in the state. The Anglican Diocese of Bauchi is part of the Province of Jos, within the Church of Nigeria.

Bauchi State has been one of the centres of sectarian violence in Nigeria.

== Islamic history ==
Islam came to Bauchi from the Borno axis in the early part of the 14th century; however, it did not get solid root until the end of the seventeenth century through the Sokoto Caliphate. Yakubu the son of Dosa of the Gerawa tribe along with Bello of Zungur from the Bakal tribe of the Jarawa were given over to a Koranic teacher at Jetar, a village on the Dindima river bank in the middle of the 17th century to learn Arabic. As the Pagans began to put pressure on Islam all over Northern Nigeria, the teacher relocated to Sokoto where he handed over Yakubu and Bello to Othman Dan Fodio. It was there that Yakubu and Bello got in touch with Shehu of Gombe.

Having spent few Years under Dan Fodio, these students graduated and were sent to go and establish Islam in their various areas. A few years after their arrival, the revolt or the Jihad of DanFodio against the Chief of Gobir broke out and Yakubu and Bello rushed to Sokoto where they were given the flag to wage Jihad in Bauchi land. Shehu went to Sokoto while Elzakio concentrated in Katagum Azare area.

Bello used common brotherhood to acquire little cooperation of the Bakal people that lived from Jetar up to Zungur-Yamrat area while Yakubus people, the Gerawa remained pagans even after his death.

Using the Jahunawa that came along with him, Yakubu and bello ran over the Gwak people without much resistance. The Galadma with his regiment turned on the Duguri people and took the village of Ngigera, now Gigera, but were blocked by the Duguri warriors in an over night battle, and he was later killed at Twalang which resulted in the battle of twonglang. Many people were killed and the battle ended without a winner.

Colonial rule led to the Duguri people to opt for Pankshin Native Authority, until 1910 when they voluntarily returned to Bauchi Native Authority.

Islam was repelled at the Dass frontier at a battle called the Mbula battle which was fought at a place called Jakiri in Dott ward of Dass Local Government. Islam was able to gain entrance through Maleka the father of Bilyaminu Othman, the first Emir of Dass. At the Rauta Ningi axis, Islam did not suffer much except in the hands of the Warji and Miya people and so the emirate allowed them to remain submissive and practice their religion until the opening of the 19th century when most of them voluntarily joined Islam.

== See also ==
- Nigerian sectarian violence
