= Igbo Jews =

Ethnic group

ndi Igbo Juu
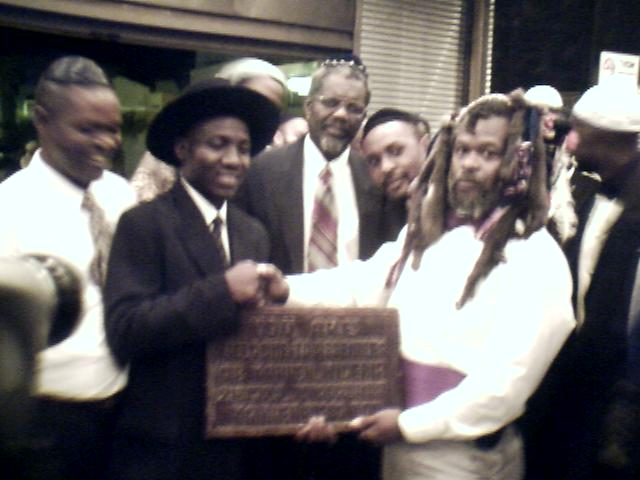
- Igbo Jewish Community presented with a plaque by Black Hebrew Israelite Howshua Amariel.

Total population
- 12,000-15,000 practicing Judaism

Regions with significant populations
- Nigeria

Languages
- Igbo; Hebrew as a liturgical language

Religion
- Igbo form of Judaism

Related ethnic groups
- Igbo

Igbo Jews are members of the Igbo people of Nigeria who practice Judaism. It is a tenet of their beliefs that they have ties to one of the lost tribes of Israel, the tribe of Gad.

Jews have been documented in parts of Nigeria since the precolonial period, but it is not known for the Igbo to have claimed Israelite descent or practiced Judaism prior to colonial times. Significant Igbo identification with Jews concretized during and after the Biafran War (1967–1970).

No formal census has been taken in the region and the precise number of Igbo in Nigeria who practice Judaism is not known. An estimated 30,000 Igbo Jews, having at least 26 synagogues of various sizes, were said to exist in 2008. In 2021 there were said to be approximately 12,000-15,000 practicing Igbo Jews in Nigeria, comprising some 70 active communities. A more conservative figure of at least 2,000-3,000 Igbo practicing Judaism, and at most 5,000, has also been given.

== Historical scrutiny ==
An early and widely influential statement from Olaudah Equiano, a Christian-educated Igbo man and freed slave, suggested a Jewish migratory origin for the Igbo. He speculated in his autobiography of 1789 on

the strong analogy which ... appears to prevail in the manners and customs of my countrymen and those of the Jews, before they reached the Land of Promise, and particularly the patriarchs while they were yet in that pastoral state which is described in Genesis—an analogy, which alone would induce me to think that the one people had sprung from the other.

Critical historians have reviewed the literature on West Africa that was published during the nineteenth and early twentieth centuries. They have clarified the diverse functions that such histories served for the writers who proposed them at various times in the colonial and post-colonial past.

Though there is no doubt that Jews were present in Saharan trade centers during the first millennium AD, there is no evidence that Igbo people had contemporaneous contact with historical Jewish populations, or that they had at any point adopted or practiced Judaism prior to colonization by the European powers.

== Religious practices ==
The religious practices of the Igbo Jews include circumcision eight days after the birth of a male child, the observance of kosher dietary laws, the separation of men and women during menstruation, the wearing of the tallit and kippah, and the celebration of holidays such as Rosh Hashanah, Yom Kippur, Hanukkah, and Purim.

== Contemporary outreach ==
Certain Nigerian communities with Judaic practices have received help from individual Israelis and American Jews who work in Nigeria, outreach organizations like the American Kulanu, and Black Hebrew Israelite communities in America.

Rabbi Howard Gorin visited the community in 2006 and members of his synagogue, "Tikvat Israel" in Rockville, Maryland, USA, supported those in Nigeria by sending books, computers, and religious articles.

In addition to Rabbi Howard Gorin, visitors have included Dr. Daniel Lis, Professor William F. S. Miles, filmmaker Jeff L. Lieberman, and the American writer Shai Afsai.

In 2013 Shai Afsai invited two Igbo Jewish leaders, Elder Ovadiah Agbai and Prince Azuka (Pinchas) Ogbukaa of Abuja's Gihon Hebrew Synagogue, to Rhode Island in the United States. The visit of the two men led Rabbi Barry Dolinger of Rhode Island to go to Nigeria with Afsai in 2014.

A main concern of Igbo Jews has been how to be part of the wider Jewish world. According to Elder Pinchas (Azuka) Ogbukaa, spokesman of Abuja's Gihon Synagogue, the "greatest of all the challenges we are facing is that of isolation."

== Igbo Jews in Israel ==
Over the past few decades, several Igbo have immigrated to Israel, particularly to Tel Aviv. This wave of immigration can partially be explained by a small diaspora that was established in Israel when Nigeria was granted independence in 1960. This is partially due to comprehensive educational programs that the Israelis implemented in the new Nigerian state after the 1960s, programs that familiarized many people with the idea of Israel as a modern nation state for the first time, and the possible opportunities that existed for Jewish people who lived there.

The Igbo Jewish community is not recognized as a Jewish community for the purpose of immigration to Israel by Israel's Supreme Court. Additionally, none of the mainstream denominations of Judaism consider the group an authentically Jewish community. Indeed, while they identify themselves as being a part of the worldwide Jewish community, they are still struggling to be recognized as Jews by Jews. An affiliate of Gihon Hebrews' Synagogue expressed this struggle to Shai Afsai in Abuja: "We say we are Jews from blood. We are now excluded; we cannot go and participate as Jews in any place. I make an appeal that we be recognized, not excluded and isolated from other Jews."

However, some Igbo Jews are currently adopting more rigorous religious customs, in order to gain more acceptance from the mainstream Jewish community. For instance, Daniel Lis explained in his article that parts of the Igbo Jewish community are assimilating themselves to the standards of Orthodox Judaism, so as to be universally accepted as Jews in Israel.

While Igbo Jews claim that they are the descendants of the ancient Israelites, others say they lack the historical evidence which would prove their descent from such a community, and they also lack evidence of a continuous practice of Judaism which should predate colonial contact. Frustrating the possibility that the state might make such a determination, and frustrating the possibility that a Jewish denomination might recognize the entire community as an authentically Jewish one is the fact that some Igbo Jews simultaneously claim to be Christians, calling their commitment to Judaism and their claim to have a Jewish identity into question. Among them are a number of Igbo who have illegally immigrated to Israel by simultaneously claiming to be Jews and Christians. According to the official administration of Israel, a number of Igbo were granted the right to travel in Israel for the purposes of Christian pilgrimage, but they have overstayed their visas, and now they are illegally living and working in the country.

The State of Israel has made no official recommendations as to whether the Igbo Jews constitute a legally recognizable Jewish community for the purposes of immigration to Israel, nor is their legal status currently being debated at any level within the state. However, several Igbo Jews who have undergone formal conversions to Orthodox or Conservative Judaism have been accepted as Jews on an individual basis under the Law of Return, and they have also immigrated to Israel.

== See also ==
- Religion in Nigeria
- Christianity and Judaism
- Groups claiming affiliation with Israelites
- History of the Jews in Africa
- Judaizers
- Abayudaya (Uganda)
- Beta Israel (Ethiopia)
- House of Israel (Ghana)
- Kingdom of Loango#Judaism in Loango
- Jews of Bilad el-Sudan
- Lemba people
