= Yusuf Janfalan =

Anglican bishop in Nigeria

Yusuf Janfalan is an Anglican bishop in Nigeria: he is the current Bishop of Ikara, one of ten dioceses within the Anglican Province of Kaduna, itself one of 14 provinces within the Church of Nigeria.
