= Anglican Diocese of Ikara =

Anglican diocese in Nigeria

The Anglican Diocese of Ikara is one of eleven within the Anglican Province of Kaduna, itself one of 14 ecclesiastical provinces within the Church of Nigeria. The current bishop is the Right Rev. Yusuf Janfalan
