= Jonathan Bamaiyi =

Anglican bishop in Nigeria

Jonathan Bamaiyi, consecrated in 1998, is an Anglican bishop in Nigeria. He is the current Bishop of Katsina, one of ten dioceses within the Anglican Province of Kaduna, itself one of 14 provinces within the Church of Nigeria.

He was elected in 2007 as Bishop of Katsina.
