= Anglican Diocese of Zaria =

Anglican diocese in Nigeria

The Anglican Diocese of Zaria is one of eleven within the Anglican Province of Kaduna, itself one of 14 ecclesiastical provinces within the Church of Nigeria. The current bishop is Abiodun Ogunyemi, who replaced Cornelius Bello in 2017.

The diocese was created out of the existing Kaduna Diocese on 7 March 2007 as the 99th diocese in the Church of Nigeria; Cornelius S S Bello was the pioneer bishop. Abiodun Ogunyemi, Bishop of Damaturu, was translated to Zaria in July 2016.
