= Watchman Catholic Charismatic Renewal Movement =

The Watchman Catholic Charismatic Renewal Movement (WCCRM), also known as Voice of the Last Days Ministry, is an international Christian Pentecostal church in Nigeria with headquarters in Lagos.

The movement was started in 1985 by Pastor Aloysius Chukwuemeka Onyenemelitobi Ohanebo, the general superintendent of WCCRM. with over hundred and twenty thousand members nationwide The movement has branches in Nigeria, in several parts of Africa, the Middle East, Europe, the United Kingdom, Canada and the United States of America.
