= Anglican Diocese of Damaturu =

Anglican diocese in Nigeria

The Anglican Diocese of Damaturu is one of ten dioceses within the Anglican Province of Jos, itself one of 14 ecclesiastical provinces within the Church of Nigeria. The current bishop is the Right Rev. Yohannah Audu. Abiodun Ogunyemi, Bishop of Damaturu, was translated to Zaria in July 2016.
