= Grail Movement =

New spiritual movement, originated in 1940s in Germany

- Formation: Early 1920s ("Orden: der Gral", 1921)
- Founder: Oskar Ernst Bernhardt ("Abd-ru-shin")
- Type: Millenarian new religious movement
- Headquarters: Grail Settlement, Vomperberg, Tyrol, Austria
- Location(s): Originally central Europe (Germany, Austria, Switzerland, Czechoslovakia); later France, Brazil, North America; today concentrated in Nigeria and elsewhere in Africa
- Members: A few thousand under Bernhardt (1920s–30s); ~40,000 "sealed" adherents as of 2021

The Grail Movement is a millenarian new religious movement which originated in central Europe in the early 1920s, revolving around the teachings of self-proclaimed messiah figure Oskar Ernst Bernhardt (also known by his pen name Abd-ru-shin 1875–1941), principally In the Light of Truth: The Grail Message.

After gathering followers and publishing his lectures in the 1920s, Bernhardt taught that the Day of Judgement, the coming of Paradise and the vanquishing of evil was imminent within his followers lifetimes, with Bernhardt and his followers constructing a communal settlement at Vomperberg in Tyrol in Austria in the late 1920s and 1930s to await the Day of Judgement. Following the failure of the Day of Judgement to materialise and Bernhardt's death, the movement declined, though it began to grow again following missionary activities in the post-WWII (World War II) period. The movement has experienced a number of schisms.

The movement is organised around groups called "Grail Circles" with initiated members known as "sealed".

Although during Bernhardt's lifetime the movement never had more than a few thousand followers primarily concentrated in central Europe (Switzerland, Czechoslovakia and Germany) as well as France and Brazil, as of 2021 there are an estimated 40,000 "sealed" adherents. Although the movement started in Europe, there are today probably more followers in Africa, especially Nigeria than in Europe.

== History ==
=== Pre-WWII period ===
Prior to World War I (WWI), German businessman Bernhardt worked abroad in London. After having been interned in Britain during WWI between 1914 and 1919 due to his German nationality, he returned to Germany and began attracting followers, naming this group "Orden: der Gral" (Order: The Grail) in 1921. In 1923, Bernhardt had a religious experience that led him to declare himself the "Son of Man" and an intermediary between God and humankind akin to Jesus, taking on the name "Abdruschin" (also spelled various other ways). In 1923, he stated publishing the Grail Papers (Gralsblätter) a journal containing his lectures and responses to readers. In 1926, these lectures were collected into the book In the Light of Truth: The New Grail Message by Abdruschin.

Bernhardt took up residence in Vomperberg, Tyrol (Austria) in 1928, where he created a communal settlement with his followers. The establishment of the Grail Settlement on Vomperberg came about when groups of readers of The Grail Message, wishing to live and work in his immediate vicinity, took up residence there. The Settlement developed gradually; adding residences, work, and administration buildings, then a small hall with seating for about 300 people. This hall was used by Abd-ru-shin for Sunday Hours of Worship and for the three annual Grail Festivals, Easter Festival etc., to which adherents of the Grail Message also journeyed.

He was described in newspapers as the Messiah of the Tyrol and the Prophet of Vomperberg. He admitted in the Grail Message that the "leading newspapers" did describe him so.

In 1929 he declared that a "Cosmic Turning Point" had been reached and that the Day of Judgement and the coming of Paradise was imminent, with his followers preparing for this events during the early 1930s. By 1936, Benhardt's followers started to become disllusioned, with the movement falling apart in 1938, when the Nazi regime annexed Austria and expropriated the Grail Settlement and put Bernhardt under surveillance, allowing him to move to Görlitz and later to Kipsdorf in the Ore Mountains in 1939. Bernhardt died in 1941 with his prophecies unfulfilled, and the movement began to decline.

=== Post-WWII period ===
After 1945 Oskar Bernhardt's wife Maria began to revive the movement and the Grail settlement in Vomperberg and local Grail circles in Germany and elsewhere. A new edition of The Grail Message was published in 1949-1950. The movement grew in the postwar period due to missionary activity in Europe, North America (with strong growth particularly in Canada) as well as in Africa, especially Nigeria from the 1980s onwards, where as of 2021 the number of followers probably now outnumber that in the whole of Europe. Maria appointed her son Alexander Freyer as the leader of the Grail Movement internationally which he held up until his death in 1968. The movement was subsequently primarily led by Irmgard Bernhardt (nee Irmgard Freyer) up until her death in 1990.

The biggest schism in the movement was in 1956, when due to conflicts over the authenticity of the new edition of The Grail Message, the Brazilian branch of the movement (primarily popular among German Brazilians) led by Roselis von Sass, split away, forming the Order of the Grail on Earth (Ordem do Graal na Terra). There were subsequently "dozens" of minor schisms of small spinter groups due to disagreements with church leadership and the timing of the coming of the Day of Judgement. There was another major schism in the movement in 1999, following conflicts after the appointment of Siegfried Bernhardt (né Siegfried Holzapfel) the husband of Claudia-Maria, the daughter of Irmgard Bernhardt's adopted daughter Marga, as leader of the movement by Irmgard at the end of her life. Siegfried Bernhardt's faction was the smaller one, with the larger faction being led by Herbert Vollmann, the husband of Elisabeth Freyer, the youngest child of Maria. This larger faction was later led by Herbert's disciple Jürgen Sprick. Siegfried's faction, despite being smaller, retains control of the assets of the main Grail settlement in Vomperberg.

In France this movement is designated as a cult (in French secte). They were present in the first report of the Parliamentary Commission on Cults in France in 1995. The movement was cited in a report by MIVILUDES after a patient with breast cancer died because she rejected chemotherapy and took homeopathic treatments at the advice of two doctors who were followers of Bernhart's teachings, resulting in the doctors being prosecuted in a criminal trial.

== Beliefs ==
Bernhardt proclaimed that he was "bringing no new religion" and did not wish to "found either a new church or any sect" and that he merely wished to give a "clear picture of the automatic activity in Creation". According to the doctrine of the Grail movement everything other than God is "created by the divine radiation of a life-giving energy, which gradually cools down and becomes denser as it gets further away from the source. The distance from the centre of this radiation thus determines spheres of substance—from spiritual to material. Different beings of creation reside in different spheres". One of the most significant spheres is the "Sphere of Divine Substantiality" which contains the "Grail Castle" and acts as a "radiation node" that connects God and the Universe, with the material world being the "densest". Bernhardt taught that that God cannot and would not interfere with his creation. One of the most important cosmic laws is that of "Law of Gravitation", which also applies to the spiritual realm, suggesting that the "human spirit can either rise up based on good desires and good thoughts or fall down into denser matter", with the movement instructing followers to keep their thoughts pure. Another important cosmic law is the "Law of the Attraction of Homogeneous Species" which states that as atoms are attracted to each other, so are spirits and thoughts that are similar to each other are attracted. The final cosmic law, the "Law of Reciprocal Action" states that everything in the Universe is connected to everything else, and that actions have unavoidable consequences.

Bernhardt taught that "unconscious human spirits are driven out of one of the immaterial spheres, the 'Spiritual Sphere', in order to become conscious of themselves and to return to higher spheres as conscious spirits." In order to become conscious spirits, they must remain within the "World of Matter" in a physical form. According to Grail doctrine, human spirits are deeply enmeshed in matter and lack the ability to contact the higher spheres. After death, humans spirits reach the "ethereal sphere" which despite its name is also material. From the "ethereal sphere", the spirit undergoes a cycle of reincarnation, causing it "to lose its awareness of its origin and the purpose of its time in the material state", which Bernhardt taught is the root of evil.

Bernhardt taught two beings descend from the highest sphere, Jesus, the Son of God, and Imanuel (also known as Sir Parsifal in the spiritual realm), the Son of Man, that latter of whom rules the Grail Castle. Abdruschin is an incarnation of Imanuel, both as Bernhardt, as well as a "an ancient prince in the Middle East who lived about three thousand years ago". Bernhardt taught that Jesus's teachings had been corrupted and that his Grail Message was in contrast able to restore people's abilities to reach the higher spiritual spheres.

The Grail Movement is millennialist, with Bernhardt teaching that the coming of the Day of Judgement and Paradise where evil and Lucifer would be vanquished by the Son of Man was coming imminently within his and his followers lifetimes, with Bernhardt declaring there had been a "Cosmic Turning Point" in 1929, with Bernhardt and his followers making preparations for the coming of Paradise during the 1930s. Bernhardt suggested that he would receive the assistance of 144,000 human spirits. Bernhardt's death without his prophecies being fulfilled (which he blamed on "144,000 spirits and the whole of humankind fail[ing] to answer [his] call") caused his followers to become disillusioned, and the movement subsequently regarded the timing of the coming of the Day of Judgement as uncertain.

Bernhardt's teaching were ethnocentric, regarding the German language as the most pure language and the white race (and more specifically the Germans) as the most advanced of all peoples, though Bernhardt strongly rejected antisemitism. Bernhardt regarded Vomperberg and its Grail Settlement as the "centre of the word, the 'Mountain of Salvation', the 'Place of Light', and the biblical Mount Zion".

== Organization and practice ==
The Grail Movement is organised into local groups called "Grail Circles". The Grail Movement is strongly hierarchical, which developed during Oscar Bernhardt's lifetime, despite his idea of a free community. Initiated members are called "sealed", also called a "crossbearer" due to possessing a Silver Cross of the Grail. Sealed members can be promoted to bearing a Gold Cross, higher ranking members are Disciples and Sealing Disciples, with Bernhardt declaring his closest followers "Apostles" and "Knights". The movement has several festivals, including the "Festival of the Holy Dove" celebrated annually on the 30 May, commemorating the "divine life force spread[ing] from the Grail Castle in the Sphere of Divine Substantiality unto all of the Creation", the "Festival of the Pure Lily" celebrated on the 7 September commemorating womanhood and purity, and the "Festival of the Radiant Star" on the 29 December, commemorating Jesus and his "message of Love".

== Publications ==
=== Grail Movement books ===
- In the Light of Truth: The Grail Message, Vol. 1 (Paperback). Abd-ru-shin, Grail Foundation Press, 1998,ISBN 1-57461-000-7
- The Ten Commandments of God and The Lord's Prayer, Abd-ru-shin, Grail Foundation Press,1995, ISBN 1-57461-004-X
- Knowledge for the World of Tomorrow, Herbert Vollmann, Grail Message Foundation, Germany, 1975, ISBN 3-87860-074-7
- What Lies Behind It...?, Herbert Vollmann, Grail Message Foundation, 1977, ISBN 3-87860-083-6
- Concerning Grail Activities, Herbert Vollmann, Grail Acres Publishing Co Ltd, 1998, ISBN 3-87860-116-6
- From the Heart of Africa, Irmingard Bernhardt, Grail Message Foundation, Grail Acres Publishing Co Ltd, 1981, ISBN 3-87860-101-8

== Bibliography ==
- Kurt Hutten: Seher - Grübler - Enthusiasten. 1997, ISBN 3-7918-2130-X, S. 531–549
- Helmut Obst: Apostel und Propheten der Neuzeit – Gründer christlicher Religionsgemeinschaften des 19. und 20. Jahrhunderts. 4., stark erweiterte und aktualisierte Auflage. Vandenhoeck & Ruprecht, Göttingen 2000, ISBN 3-525-55438-9
- Andreas Plagge: "Bernhardt, Oskar Ernst". In: Biographisch-Bibliographisches Kirchenlexikon (BBKL). Band 22, Bautz, Nordhausen 2003, ISBN 3-88309-133-2, Sp. 120–122, BERNHARDT, Oskar Ernst (Abd-ru-shin).
- Georg Schmid: Kirchen, Sekten, Religionen. 2003, ISBN 3-290-17215-5, S. 219–221
- Lothar Gassmann: Zukunft, Zeit, Zeichen. Aufruf zur Wachsamkaeit, Verlag für Reformatorische Erneurung, Kaiserstr.78, D-42329 Wuppertal, 103 Seiten, Laßt Euch nicht verführen!.
- Patrick Diemling: Neuoffenbarungen Religionswissenschaftliche Perspektiven auf Texte und Medien des 19. und 20. Jahrhunderts, Universitätsverlag Potsdam, 2012, Neuoffenbarungen.
