= Abiodun Ogunyemi =

Anglican bishop in Nigeria

Abiodun Ogunyemi is the Anglican Bishop of Zaria in Kaduna Province of the Church of Nigeria.

Ogunyemi was consecrated as Bishop of Zaria in July 2017 at the Archbishop Vining Memorial Church Cathedral in Ikeja, having previously been Bishop of Damaturu.
