= Mubarak Bala =

Nigerian humanist activist (born 1984)

- Born: 1984 (age 41–42); Kano, Nigeria
- Known for: President of the Nigerian Humanist Association
- Honours: Gordon Ross Humanist of the Year award, 2021 – Humanist Society Scotland

Mubarak Bala (born 1984) is a Nigerian atheist and president of the Humanist Association of Nigeria. After leaving Islam and publicly expressing atheist views, the Kano State High Court sentenced Bala to 24 years' imprisonment in 2022 after he pleaded guilty to an 18-count charge of blasphemy and public incitement. In 2024, he was released after four years of imprisonment, and he relocated to Germany.

== Early life ==
Bala was born in Kano, northern Nigeria, in 1984. In a 2016 article on his "personal journey", he stated that he lost his faith "little by little" as he grew and met people outside of his conservative and religious hometown. His criticism became more vocal as terror attacks increased in Nigeria.

What finally made me come out as atheist was a video of a beheading of a female Christian back in 2013 by boys around my age, speaking my language. It hit me that the time for silence is over. Either someone speaks out or we all sink."

When he came out as an atheist, in 2014, he was forcibly committed to a psychiatric institution in Kano, reportedly at the insistence of his "deeply religious family". He was held there for eighteen days, and (according to Bala) "beaten, sedated and threatened with death if [he] tried to leave".

One doctor believed there was nothing wrong with Bala, but a second doctor suggested a personality disorder and, according to Bala, told him:

My dear, you need a God, even in Japan, they have a God, no one should live without God, those that do, are all psychologically ill, denying the biblical account of Adam and Eve is delusion, denial of history.

The International Humanist and Ethical Union has taken up the case and believes Bala's human rights were violated. According to the IHEU, "The real reason for this outrageous and inhumane action is because Mubarak has renounced Islam and has openly declared himself to be an atheist." On 4 July 2014, the BBC reported that Bala had been released from hospital in conjunction with a doctors' strike and was seeking reconciliation with his family. It was not clear if he would remain in Nigeria, due to death threats.

== Arrest and conviction ==
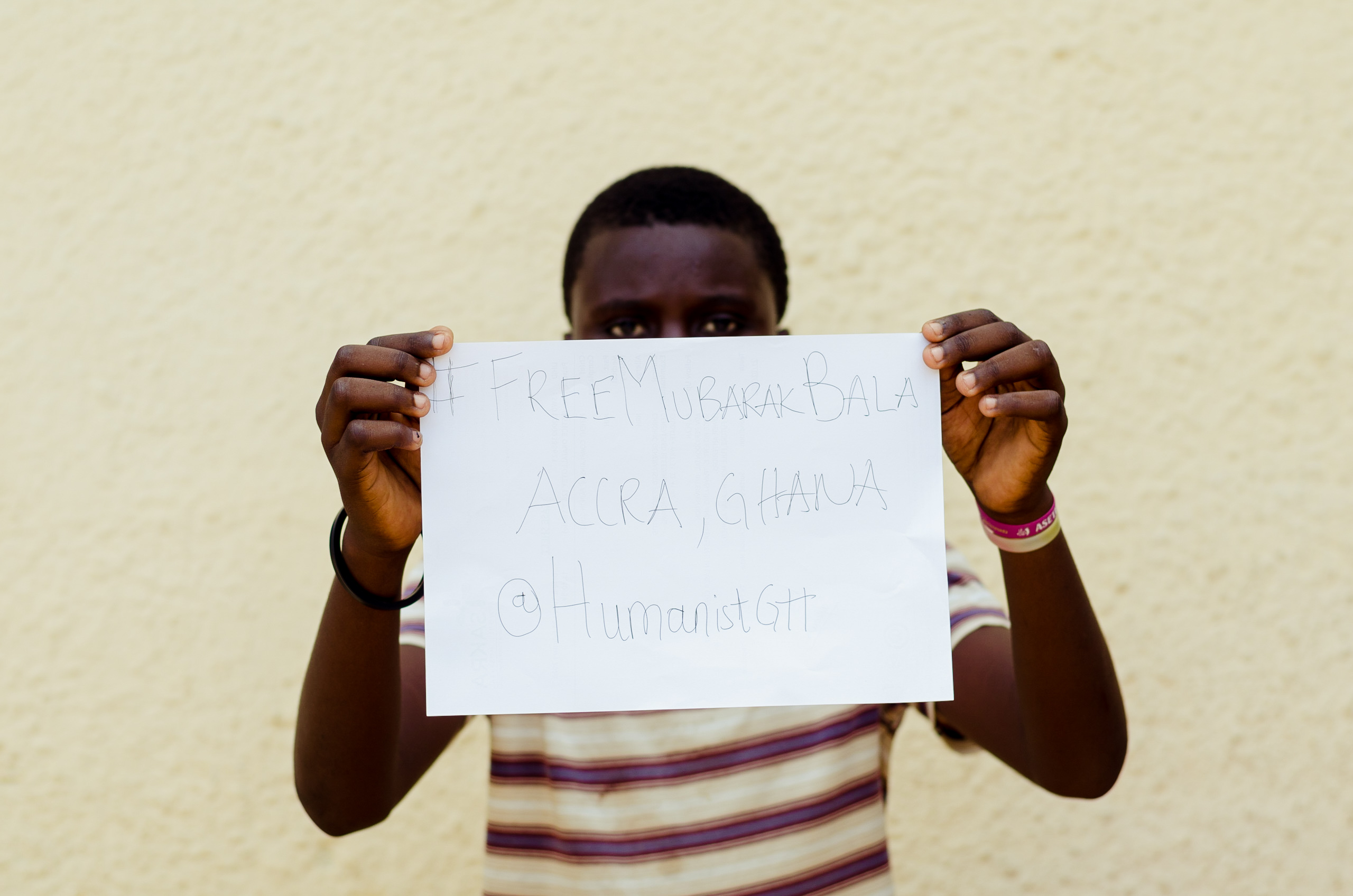
A Ghanaian activist holds up a sign in support of Mubarak Bala in 2020

Bala decided to stay in Nigeria and was named president of the Nigerian Humanists. In April 2020, he was arrested in Kaduna for blasphemy, due to a Facebook post he made, and was subsequently held without charge. Fears mounted for his safety due to the fact that the Nigerian police allegedly transferred him from the state of Kaduna to Kano, where Sharia law is practiced, and in the face of several credible death threats. According to his lawyer, while in prison, Bala was "denied access to healthcare, kept in solitary confinement, and forced to worship the Islamic way".

Human rights activist Leo Igwe worked to support Bala's rights, in conjunction with several atheist and humanist organisations, including Humanism International and Atheist Alliance International. Also, the newly formed International Association of Atheists (IAA) joined forces to raise awareness and funds to help pay Bala's legal costs. The United States Commission on International Religious Freedom (USCIRF) also took an interest in Bala and started applying pressure on the Nigerian government. Jamie Raskin has advocated for his release as part of the Tom Lantos Human Rights Commission's Defending Freedoms project, and a petition was filed at the Working Group on Arbitrary Detention on his behalf.

On 5 April 2022, Mubarak was sentenced to 24 years in prison at a (secular) high court in the northern state of Kano, after pleading guilty to all 24 charges and asking for leniency.

Following his guilty plea, the Humanist Association stated that the plea had not been "part of the agreed legal strategy" and that Bala may have been subject to intimidation by the prosecution, and/or "tricked into pleading guilty in the hopes of a light sentence".

The chair of the International Religious Freedom or Belief Alliance, a network of countries promoting freedom of religion or belief worldwide, has called for Bala to be pardoned.

== Release from prison ==
International pressure from European governments and campaigning from Humanists International member organisations led to Mubarak's release from prison in late 2024. He was relocated to Bavaria, Germany, with support from the German government, where he received a six-month fellowship with the Humanist Society's Shelter Program, funded by the Elisabeth Selbert Initiative.

== Personal background ==
Bala's family is "descended from generations of Islamic scholars". He is a chemical process engineer by education and has a wife and a young son, who was born six weeks before Bala's arrest.

== Recognition ==
Bala was honoured with the Gordon Ross Humanist of the Year award in 2021 by Humanist Society Scotland.

The Nobel Prize-winning Nigerian author Wole Soyinka has expressed concern that Bala's arrest was part of a "plague of religious extremism" that has afflicted Nigeria in recent decades.

== Bibliography ==
- Handbook of Research on Promoting Global Citizenship Education. United States, IGI Global, 2022.Page 260
- The Routledge Handbook of Religious Literacy, Pluralism, and Global Engagement. United Kingdom, Taylor & Francis, 2021.
- Falola, Toyin. Understanding Modern Nigeria: Ethnicity, Democracy, and Development. United Kingdom, Cambridge University Press, 2021. Page 215
- Brinkmann, Svend. Diagnostic Cultures: A Cultural Approach to the Pathologization of Modern Life. United Kingdom, Taylor & Francis, 2016. Page 13 & 111
- Abdullahi, Aminu A. "A Season of Monotheism: Muslim Response to Humanist Cyberactivism in Northern Nigeria". SocArXiv, 20 February 2020.
- Ibezim-Ohaeri, V. and Ibeh, Z. (2020) "The Civic Space in Nigeria: Before and Beyond Covid-19". Baseline Report, Lagos: Spaces for Change

== See also ==
- Discrimination against atheists
- Liberal Christianity
- Liberalism and progressivism within Islam
