= Religion in Niger State =

The primary religion in Niger State, Nigeria, is Islam. There is a Christian minority, and very small numbers of atheists and followers of indigenous religions.
