= In the Light of Truth: The Grail Message =

Book by Oskar Ernst Bernhardt

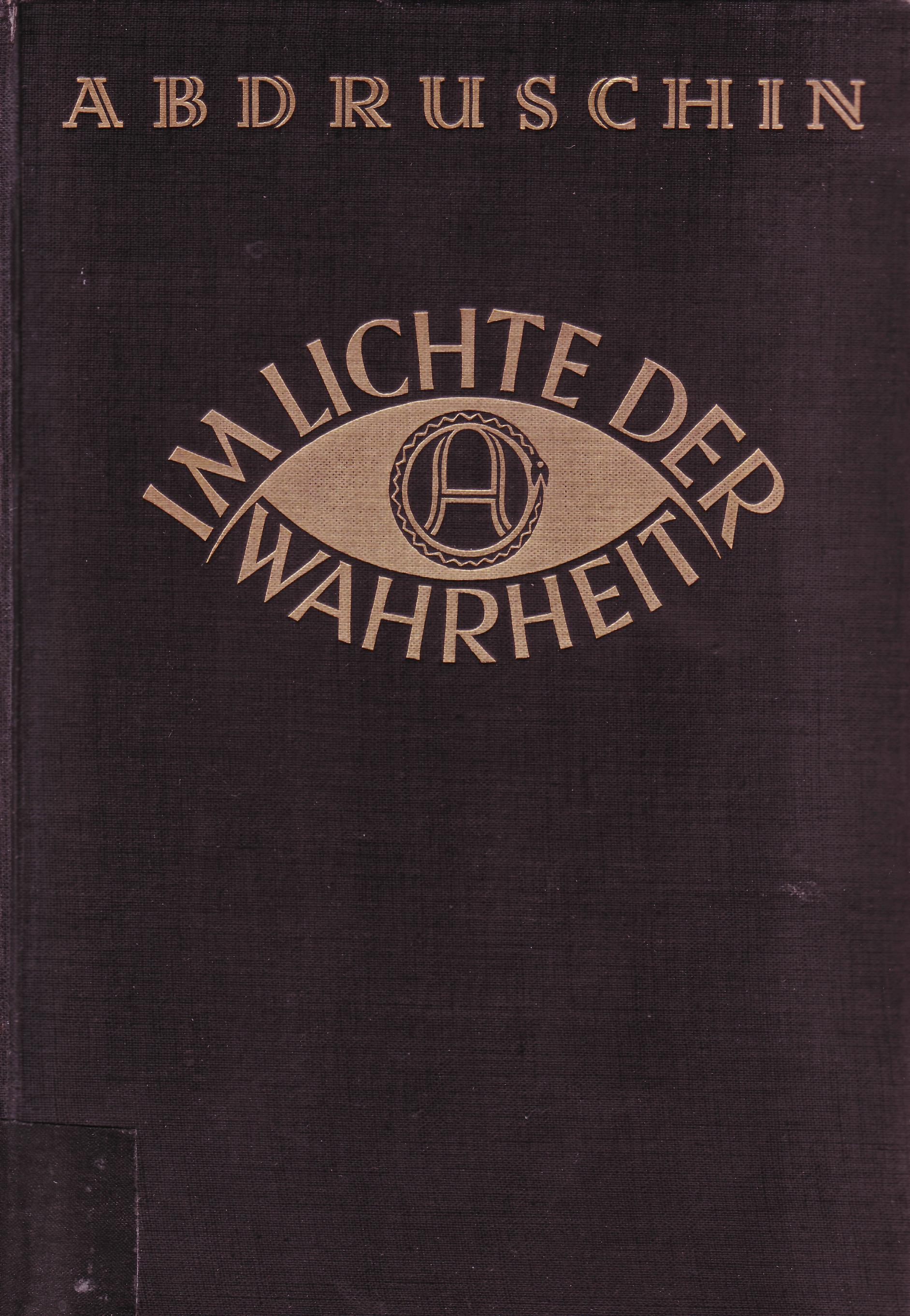
- Cover of the 1931 version of the book by "Abdruschin"
- Author: Oskar Ernst Bernhardt
- Publication date: 1926

In the Light of Truth: The Grail Message is a book written by Oskar Ernst Bernhardt (1875–1941), the leader of the Grail Movement, a millenarian new religious movement, and first published in 1926 under the pen name Abd-ru-shin. An expanded, complete edition was published by the author under the name of Abdruschin in 1931, entitled Im Lichte der Wahrheit (In the Light of the Truth). It was a collection of 91 lectures, written to build upon each other, presenting a complete picture of Creation. Between 1931 and 1934, a further total of 59 additional lectures were released.

Abd-ru-shin went on to write and publish more than 50 individual lectures after 1934, however the deteriorating conditions in Europe prevented him from publishing any further books during his lifetime. When the Nazis seized power in Austria in 1938, Abd-ru-shin was arrested, extradited to Germany, and kept under house arrest until his death in December 1941.

During his final years, Abd-ru-shin was forbidden by the Gestapo from working on the Grail Message. Abd-ru-shin never authorized any changes after publishing his 1931 version; he wrote, "I do not hand over the Message so that you can deal with It as you see fit in your efforts to transmit It to humanity, but I COMMAND that It must remain immutable in all that It contains and in the way It is! Whoever will change even the slightest meaning, the smallest word, even with the best intention, is guilty of wrongdoing! It is the Holy Word of God, which man may not touch in order to adapt It in a way more convenient for himself or for easier understanding by indolent human spirits!"

Abd-ru-shin is a self-proclaimed Messiah according to the original 1931 edition of The Grail Message, specifically in the conclusion of the 1931 edition. He removed the explicit statement of the claim from the 1937 and later editions, but it still is the meaning for the Message of the Grail that Abd-ru-shin is the apocalyptic Son of Man.

== Synopsis ==
The following Word does not bring a new religion, but is intended as the torch to help all serious listeners or readers find the right path, which leads them to the longed-for height.The Message will strike only those who openly carry within them a spark of Truth, and the yearning to be true human beings. To all such It will become the shining light and staff. It will lead them unswervingly out of all the chaos of the present-day confusion." It answers ALL of life's questions, and gives a much deeper understanding of God's Laws...The Ten Commandments and The Golden Rule.

Abd-ru-shin's Grail Message addresses various topics, ranging from God and the universe to the "Laws in Creation", free will and responsibility, intuition and the intellect, the ethereal world and the beyond, justice and love. The Grail Message addresses eternal questions such as what does it mean to be human, what is the purpose of life on earth, and what happens after death. The Grail Message also addresses the causes and significance of crises facing humanity and humanity's responsibilities to the future.

The publishers write

This book ... answers with clarity all the unsolved questions of human existence. The recognitions mediated with this book are so immense that they force the unprejudiced reader to ponder, investigate and go forward. The Grail Message will appeal to any human being who is seeking to understand life, his or her place in Creation, and the source of one's being.

In the Light of Truth: The Grail Message was written to address and provide spiritual support for the problems and questions in life: Where do we come from? Where do we go when we die? What about fate and karma, Divine justice, free will, the Mission of Jesus, the Son of God, the Laws of Nature and Creation, and many others. In the Light of Truth also gives information about the Holy Grail. While ancient sagas and legends, and modern art, depict the Grail as an earthly myth, without being able to provide a conclusive explanation of its significance, Abd-ru-shin describes the Grail as a spiritual reality of the highest order, the connecting point between the Creator and His Creation.

According to the explanations of Creation given in The Grail Message, human beings are actually only guests on this earth. They came from a spiritual realm, which is far above the world of earthly matter, in order to begin a course of development leading down to this earth. This path continues for each person through repeated earth lives (reincarnation). Through experiences each person's inner, spiritual consciousness develops, grows, and matures. This is the prerequisite for the way back to the spiritual realm, which is the goal of our path of development: people can and should return to the immortality of the spiritual realm as a conscious spiritual entity, and thus enter "Paradise."

In the Light of Truth: The Grail Message posits that "The Laws of Creation" provide each human spirit with support on their pathway though their existence. Unchangeably interwoven from the beginning, they bear within, like the Ten Commandments, the Love, Grace, and Justice of the Creator. To truly know and understand the way these laws work is essential for successfully navigating one's way through life. Therefore, the explanation of these Laws runs like a thread through the lectures of The Grail Message.

The book also describes the relationship between the sexes: "male" and "female", each representing a specific, separate "principle", each of equal value for the total Creation. In the Light of Truth describes that there is a polarity between man and woman, which having been misunderstood in the past has often resulted in confusion over the intrinsic nature of their respective activities and the purpose of the sexes.

The cult leader (Bernhardt) announced an imminent coming of God's Kingdom on Earth, and his adepts were baffled why that failed to happen.

He was described in newspapers as the Messiah of the Tyrol and the Prophet of Vomperberg. He admitted in the Grail Message that the "leading newspapers" did describe him so.

== Publication ==
The Grail Message: In the Light of Truth in three volumes, containing 168 lectures (including lectures published in separate books and in individual form after 1931), was first published in 1950, and is currently available from the Grail Foundation.

== Bibliography ==
- Kurt Hutten: Seher - Grübler - Enthusiasten. 1997, ISBN 3-7918-2130-X, S. 531–549
- Helmut Obst: Apostel und Propheten der Neuzeit – Gründer christlicher Religionsgemeinschaften des 19. und 20. Jahrhunderts. 4., stark erweiterte und aktualisierte Auflage. Vandenhoeck & Ruprecht, Göttingen 2000, ISBN 3-525-55438-9
- Andreas Plagge: "Bernhardt, Oskar Ernst". In: Biographisch-Bibliographisches Kirchenlexikon (BBKL). Band 22, Bautz, Nordhausen 2003, ISBN 3-88309-133-2, Sp. 120–122, .
- Georg Schmid: Kirchen, Sekten, Religionen. 2003, ISBN 3-290-17215-5, S. 219–221
- Lothar Gassmann: Zukunft, Zeit, Zeichen. Aufruf zur Wachsamkaeit, Verlag für Reformatorische Erneurung, Kaiserstr.78, D-42329 Wuppertal, 103 Seiten, .
- Patrick Diemling: Neuoffenbarungen Religionswissenschaftliche Perspektiven auf Texte und Medien des 19. und 20. Jahrhunderts, Universitätsverlag Potsdam, 2012,.

== See also ==
- Grail Movement
- Messiah complex
