= Anglican Diocese of Katsina =

Anglican diocese in Nigeria

The Anglican Diocese of Katsina is one of eleven within the Anglican Province of Kaduna, itself one of 14 ecclesiastical provinces within the Church of Nigeria. The current bishop is Jonathan Bamaiyi
