= Churches of Christ in Nigeria =

Group of churches in Nigeria

Churches of Christ is a grouping of the Christian denomination in Nigeria. It dates from 1947. The Fellowship of Churches of Christ in Nigeria is something different.

== States with presence of Churches of Christ (incomplete) ==
- Abuja
- Akwa Ibom State
- Anambra State
- Cross River State
- Delta State
- Imo State
- Kaduna State
- Lagos State
- Ogun State
- Ondo State
- Oyo State
- Plateau State
- Rivers State
- Sokoto State

== See also ==
- Christianity in Nigeria
