= Sharia in Nigeria =

Islamic law in Nigeria

Use of Sharia in Nigeria: Sharia plays no role in the judicial system. Sharia applies only in personal status issues (such as marriage, divorce, inheritance, and child custody), but otherwise the legal system is secular. Sharia applies in full, including personal status issues and criminal law.

In Nigeria, Sharia has been instituted as a main body of civil and criminal law in twelve Muslim-majority states since 1999, when then-Zamfara State governor Ahmad Sani Yerima began the push for the institution of Sharia at the state level of government. A "declaration of full Sharia law" was made in the twelve states in that year, and the states created Islamic legal institutions such as a Sharia Commission, and Zakat Commission, and a hisbah (a sort of an Islamic police). According to some critics (Leo Igwe, chair of the board of trustees for the Humanist Association of Nigeria), the adoption of Sharia law violates Article 10 of the Nigerian constitution guaranteeing religious freedom.

== States ==
Twelve out of Nigeria's thirty-six states have Islam as the dominant religion. Since 2000, those states have reintroduced sharia criminal courts alongside common law and customary law courts, and the Supreme Court has thus far avoided ruling on the measure's apparent unconstitutionality.

As of 2025, the following 12 states have instituted Sharia:

- Zamfara State (27 January 2000)
- Kano State (21 June 2000)
- Sokoto State
- Katsina State (August 2000)
- Bauchi State (June 2001)
- Borno State
- Jigawa State
- Kebbi State
- Yobe State
- Kaduna State
- Niger State (4 May 2000)
- Gombe State

== Hisbah ==
To promote Islamic virtue and discourage vice, each of the twelve states has a Hisbah group, but each of these hisbah is "unique". For example, as of 2016: "Kano and Zamfara hisbah have their foundations in state law", "have a legally sanctioned board or commission with state-wide powers", and get state funding to pay the salaries of "thousands of people". The hisbah in Gombe state "has no legal backing", no supporting legislation, no "state funding, and is made up of volunteers" who "sometimes have to contribute financially to the running of the organization". Borno state hisbah "exists only on paper."

According to Human Rights Watch, hisbah activities in Nigeria bear a similarity to other vigilante groups in that country, in that they are "made up mostly of locally-recruited young men who usually patrol their own neighborhoods and sometimes instantly administer punishments on people suspected of carrying out an offense, without, or before, handing them over to the police".

Human Rights Watch sees as problematic the fact that "the majority" of hisbah members have "a low level of formal education, no background in law, and no training in law enforcement or procedures for arrest, investigation, or gathering of evidence. Human Rights Watch is not aware of any women joining the hisbah in Nigeria." While there are not set laws on hisbah procedure, according to a "common understanding" of what hisbah are allowed to do, "they are expected to arrest criminals", but not "to enter people’s private homes or spy on them merely on the basis of suspicion". In practice, "these and other guidelines" have often been disregarded and people’s "right to privacy" violated. While Hisbah members have been responsible for "flogging and beating suspected criminals", unlike some vigilante groups "as of 2004, Human Rights Watch was not aware of killings by hisbah members". (Note: ... in contrast to other vigilante groups like the Bakassi Boys in the southeast and the Oodua People’s Congress in the southwest of the country, who have committed numerous extrajudicial killings and other abuses.) After Shari’a was introduced, "from 2000 to around 2002, there were "numerous reports of abuses by the hisbah", with flogging and beating punishments administered on the spot, particularly by non-official hisbah, but by 2003 abuses by the hisbah "appear to have decreased".

According to the Nigeria Stability and Reconciliation Programme (NSRP), while the "coercive disciplinary functions" of hisbah attract media attention, hisbah are also or could also be involved in dispute resolution, marriage counselling, helping the poor, etc.

== Blasphemy ==
Blasphemy is a criminal offense in both the Nigerian civil law and shari'a law. Some notable cases have been overturned or sent back to be retried. On 10 August 2020, Omar Farouq, a 16-year-old (tried as an adult under Islamic law having passed puberty), was sentenced to 10 years in prison with menial labour for "using foul language toward Allah in an argument with a friend." The case was protested by UNICEF, and after being held "for over five months with no access to family or lawyers" the case was overturned by the appellate division of the Kano State High Court and Farouq was released. Yahaya Sharif-Aminu, a 22-year-old music studio assistant who was sentenced to death on 10 August 2020 for making "a blasphemous statement against Prophet Mohammed in a WhatsApp Group", was "remitted back to the Sharia court for a retrial due to procedural irregularities".

== Violations and issues of Sharia ==
=== Music ===
Hisbah have targeted the playing of music as un-Islamic. In Kano State, on 30 May 2003, a group of about twenty hisbah disrupted a wedding party on the basis that it was an “immoral gathering” and that music was being played. Several guests, musicians and members of the wedding ceremony were beaten and injured. Musical instruments and a windscreen of a vehicle parked at the house were smashed as well. According to the police, the hisbah were armed with knives, sticks, and various swords. In an example of a clash between police and hisbah, local police arrested about thirty members of the hisbah, however, they were all released without charge.

=== Homosexuality ===
Homosexuality is a criminal offence in both the civil law of Nigeria and shari'a law. The two most common religions in Nigeria, Islam and Christianity, as well as the traditions of the people forbid homosexuality.

In 2014, homosexual men were targeted by Hisbah, the religious police. In Nigeria, federal law criminalizes homosexual behaviour, while states with Sharia law impose the death penalty, although no executions have been carried out.

In December 2018, several women in Kano were arrested by the Hisbah for allegedly planning a same-sex wedding. In January 2019, the 11 women were fined by the Sharia court under the state’s Immoral Acts law.

In July 2022, three men aged 20, 30 and 70 years old were charged with "committing the offence of sodomy" and sentenced to death by stoning (rajm).

=== Mannequins ===
As of 30 June 2021, the Kano State Hisbah Board (Kano State is the most populous in Nigeria as of the most recent census) banned the use of mannequins "to display clothes by tailors, supermarkets and boutique owners" in Kano state. The Hisbah Commander-in-Chief, Ustaz Harun Muhammad Sani Ibn Sina issued a statement: “Hisbah prohibits the use of mannequins at shops, commercial and private residences and other public places. This violates Islamic provisions, it is also responsible for immoral thoughts among some members of the public, all these are against Islam." In August 2021, it forbade the use of mannequins with heads to advertise clothing in shops, Ibn Sina stating, "Islam frowns on idolatry. With the head on it looks like a human being." the headless mannequins should be "covered at all times" because to show "the shape of the breast, the shape of the bottom, is contrary to the teachings of Sharia".

=== Alcohol ===
In 2020, the Kano State Hisbah Board implemented the destruction of 1,975,000 bottles of beer worth over N200 million (almost US$500,000) that had been confiscated within metropolitan Kano.

=== Haircuts ===
In 2020, the Kano State Islamic police shaved off the Mohawk hairstyles of young men on the pavements of Kano city. Another report stated that Afro hair was punished by Hisbah in Kaduna state, despite there being no such prohibition in Islam.

=== Execution(s) ===
From the time Nigeria's Sharia courts were reintroduced in 1999 to 2020, only one death sentence passed by the courts has been carried out. In 2002, a man who pled guilty to murdering a woman and her two children was convicted under Sharia laws in Katsina State and hanged.

== Sharia Court of Appeals ==
Recognized as a federal court of appeals under the government of Nigeria, the Sharia Court of Appeals is the most controversial of the judicial system. It exists within the Federal Capital Territory of Nigeria and is a part of the Unified Courts System. The Sharia Court of Appeals reviews cases involving Sharia law, particularly in the North and Northeast regions of the country. This has caused controversy because while the Sharia Court of Appeals interprets and reviews cases relating to Islamic law, they must also interpret the common and customary laws of the other regions of Nigeria.

== Controversy ==
Some argue that as implemented in the north, Sharia violates the Constitution of Nigeria.

=== Legal status ===
Sharia used to be categorized as a customary law in Nigeria. This position has changed given the judicial pronouncement in the case of Alkamawa V Bello (1998) LPELR-SC.293/1991. Hence, Sharia is now seen as a distinct and universal legal system.

=== Protests and non-Muslims ===
There have been numerous riots over the implementation of Sharia, primarily involving non-Muslim minorities in the states that implemented the system. One riot against "the decision of the Kano state government to adopt Sharia law" led to the death over 100 people in October 2001 in Kano State.

In theory, the sharia legal system and hisbah enforcement apply only to Muslims, but according to the BBC, "in reality, non-Muslims come under pressure to adhere to the hisbah's rulings". In 2020, trucks carrying alcoholic beverages belonging to non-Muslims were destroyed and bars were raided by the hisbah after it accused owners of "corrupt acts".

=== Amina Lawal ===
In 2002, negative light was brought to Sharia in northern Nigeria when Amina Lawal, a single mother in Katsina State, was accused of adultery and sentenced to death by stoning by a state Sharia court for conceiving a child out of wedlock; the father was released without conviction for lack of evidence. Lawal's conviction provoked outrage both in southern Nigeria and the West, with many national and international NGOs lobbying the federal government to overturn her conviction. In 2004, the conviction was overturned by the Sharia court of appeal. It ruled that pregnancy was insufficient evidence for the sentence to be carried out and Lawal returned to private life.

=== Safiya Hussaini ===
Safiya Hussaini was a woman that was charged with adultery with a married neighbour by the state of Sokoto and was sentenced to be stoned due to giving birth to a child as a single mother. She was defended by Hauwa Ibrahim and the case was later dismissed.

== See also ==
- Religion in Nigeria
- Blasphemy law in Nigeria
- Polygamy in Nigeria
- Islam in Nigeria
