= Religious violence in Nigeria =

Religious massacres in Nigeria

Religious Conflicts in Nigeria
- Part of the Communal conflicts in Nigeria
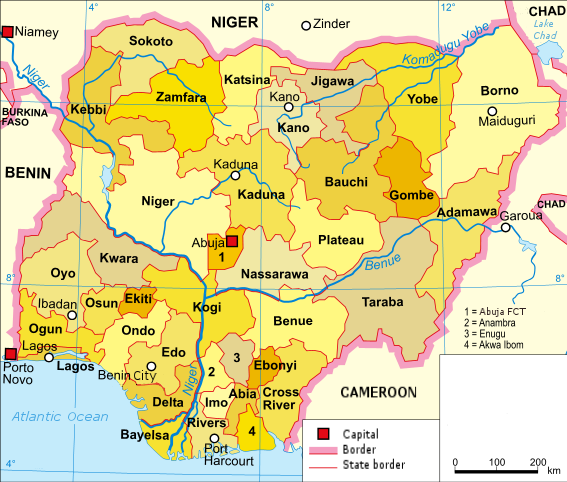
- Map of the 36 States of Nigeria
Date	1953 – present (73 years)
Location	Nigeria
Status	Ongoing

Belligerents
Christians: Adara, Atyap, Berom, Jukun, Tiv and Tarok farmers; (Republic of Biafra) Biafran separatists; Oduduwa separatists	Muslims: Fulani and Hausa herders; (Islamic State) Boko Haram; Islamic State – West Africa Province; Lakurawa	Nigeria: (Nigeria) Nigerian Armed Forces; Nigeria Police Force; Multinational Joint Task Force (from 1994): Cameroon; Chad; Niger; Benin; Local militias and vigilantes: CJTF BOYES (Nigeria); Comités de vigilance (Chad, Cameroon); Dan banga (Niger); Foreign mercenaries: STTEP

Religious violence in Nigeria refers to Christian–Muslim strife in Nigeria tracing back to 1953. The present religious violence in Nigeria is dominated by the Boko Haram insurgency, which aims to establish an Islamic state in northern Nigeria. University of Johannesburg law professor Werner Nicolaas Nel has noted that this has resulted in the persecution of Christians in Nigeria. Organisations that monitor political violence in Nigeria have reported that the majority of victims of jihadist groups are Muslim. The Armed Conflict Location & Event Data Project (ACLED) reported that, as of 2025, just under 53,000 Muslims and Christians had been killed in targeted political violence since 2009. According to ACLED's 2022 report, although Christians constitute roughly 50% of the population, violence explicitly targeting Christians on the basis of religion accounted for 5% of reported civilian-targeting events. This includes murder, as well as the abduction of Roman Catholic and Methodist clergy. In 2025, the conflict garnered international attention with United States president Donald Trump vowing military action in Nigeria if the attacks against Christians did not subside.

== History ==
Nigeria was amalgamated in 1914, only about a decade after the defeat of the Sokoto Caliphate and other Islamic states by the British, which were to constitute much of Northern Nigeria. The aftermath of the First World War saw Germany lose its colonies, one of which was Cameroon, to French, Belgian and British mandates. Cameroon was divided into French and British parts, the latter of which was further subdivided into southern and northern parts. Following a plebiscite in 1961, the Southern Cameroons elected to rejoin French Cameroon, while the Northern Cameroons opted to join Nigeria, a move which added to Nigeria's already large Northern Muslim population. The territory comprised much of what is now Northeastern Nigeria, and a large part of the areas affected by the present and past insurgencies.

In 1948, the town of Tafawa Balewa saw religious tension. The Kano riot of 1953 was an outbreak of violence between Northern and Southern Nigerians with different views on self-government.

In the 1970s, Muslim preacher Maitatsine led a militant Quranist movement, Yan Tatsine. It was responsible for the 1980 Kano riot, in which over 4,177 civilians, 100 policemen and about 35 military personnel were killed, including Maitatsine himself. The riot marked the start of the Yan Tatsine insurgency in the early 1980s.

=== 1980s ===
In the 1980s, a serious outbreak between Christians and Muslims occurred in Kafanchan in southern Kaduna State in a border area between the two religions, propagated by extreme leaders who were able to rally a young, educated individuals who feared that the nation would not be able to protect their religious group. The leaders polarised their followers through speeches and public demonstrations.

These activities led to the loss of lives and properties as they moved about destroying government facilities which they saw as legacies or replicas of western cultures in their various communities. These religious campaigns saw gun battles between the members of these sects and security forces with loss of lives on both sides. Although direct conflicts between Christians and Muslims were rare, tensions did flare between the two groups as they radicalised. There were clashes in October 1982 when Muslim zealots in Kano were able to enforce their power in order to keep the Anglican House Church from expanding its size and power base. They saw it as a threat to the nearby Mosque, even though the Anglican House Church had been there forty years prior to the building of the Mosque. Additionally, two student groups came into contestation, the Fellowship of Christian Students and the Muslim Student Society. In one instance an evangelical campaign organised by the FCS brought into question why one sect should dominate the campus of the Kaduna State College of Education in Kafanchan. This quarrel accelerated to and Muslim students organised protests around the city and burned a church at the college. Members of the Christian majority at the college retaliated on March 9. Twelve people died, several mosques were burnt and a climate of fear was created. The retaliation was pre-planned.

Media channels propagated the ideas of the conflict, further radicalising each force. Media was biased on each side so for instance the Federal Radio Corporation discussed defending Islam during this moment of terror, it did not report the deaths and damage caused by Muslims, galvanising the Muslim population. Similarly, the Christian papers did not report the damage and deaths caused by Christians but rather focused on the Islamic terror. Individuals leading these religious movements used the media to spread messages which gradually became more intolerant of other religions.

In the same decade, the military ruler of Nigeria, General Ibrahim Babangida, enrolled Nigeria in the Organisation of the Islamic Conference. This was a move which aggravated religious tensions in the country, particularly among the Christian community. In response, some in the Muslim community pointed out that certain other African member states have smaller proportions of Muslims, as well as Nigeria's diplomatic relations with the Holy See.

=== 1990s ===
In 1991, the German evangelist Reinhard Bonnke was accused of attempting to start a crusade in Kano, causing a religious riot leading to the deaths of more than a dozen people.

Since the return of democracy to Nigeria in 1999, Sharia was instituted as a main body of civil and criminal law in 9 Muslim-majority and in some parts of 3 Muslim-plurality states, when then-Zamfara State governor Ahmad Rufai Sani began the push for the institution of Sharia at the state level of government.

=== 2000s ===
Since the restoration of democracy in 1999, secular governments have dominated the country at the federal level, while the Muslim-dominated Northern Nigerian states have implemented strict Sharia law. Religious conflict between Muslims and Christians has erupted several times since 2000 for various reasons, often causing riots with several thousands of victims on both sides.

The events of Abuja in 2000 and Jos in 2001 were riots between Christians and Muslims in Jos, Nigeria about the appointment of a Muslim politician, Alhaji Muktar Mohammed, as local coordinator of the federal programme to fight poverty. Another such riot killed over 100 people in October 2001 in Kano State.

In 2002, the Nigerian journalist Isioma Daniel wrote an article that led to the demonstrations and violence that caused the deaths of over 200 in Kaduna, as well as a fatwa placed on her life. The 2002 Miss World contest was moved from Abuja to London as a result. The rest of the 2000s decade would see inter-religious violence continue in Jos and Kaduna.

In early May 2004, militiamen from the mainly Christian Tarok ethnic group attacked the town of Yelwa in Nigeria's Plateau state. The raid targeted the town's Muslim community, composed mainly of Hausa and Fulani members. Following the attack, a Red Cross official reported that, based on survivor accounts and physical evidence, the death toll was estimated to be over 600 people.

The reaction to the 2006 Mohammed cartoons brought about a series of violent protests in Nigeria. Clashes between rioters and police claimed several lives, with estimates ranging from 16 to more than a hundred. This led to reprisal attacks in the south of the country, particularly in Onitsha. More than a hundred lost their lives.

=== 2010s–2020s ===
Since 2009, the Islamist movement Boko Haram has fought an armed rebellion against the Nigerian military, sacking villages and towns and taking thousands of lives in battles and massacres against Christians, students and others deemed enemies of Islam.

In February 2015, NBC reported that nearly 200 Christian churches were destroyed by Boko Haram. The report cited U.S. intelligence officers and experts who said 2 million people in northeast Nigeria, including 200,000 Christians, could be at risk of slaughter by Boko Haram. According to the START Global Terrorism Database (GTD), 20 assassination attempts were carried out by Boko Haram between 2013 and 2014, resulting in the deaths of approximately 78 individuals, including the Secretary of the Christian Association of Nigeria, village heads, district leaders, the leader of the opposition party, an Islamic scholar, government officials and leaders, emirs, members of the political parties All Progressives Congress (APC) and People's Democratic Party (PDP), and police officers.

In 2018, US President Donald Trump called out the killing of Christians in Nigeria.

ACLED noted that violence aimed at Christians "increased by 21% in 2021 compared to 2020."

In May 2022, according to Aid to the Church in Need (ACN) Deborah Yakubu, a Christian student in Sokoto, was lynched outside her university, allegedly by a Muslim mob. Following this, there was violence against other Christian sites, according to a statement released by the Catholic Diocese of Sokoto, which alleged attacks on the Catholic churches.

In June 2022, according to ACN, a massacre left over 50 parishioners dead in the St. Francis Xavier Church, in Owo. Responsibility for the attack was unclear, but the Government blamed ISWAP, whereas many locals blamed Fulani herdsmen. Five men were arrested and charged for the attack, with four being found guilty and one acquitted. The Catholic bishop of Ondo, Jude Arogundade, expressed his relief and hope that the families of the victims could now find closure.

Besides issues with terrorist groups Boko Haram and ISWAP, Christians also complain of persecution by Fulani herdsmen, who are mostly Muslim, and who have attacked mostly Christian farmers in the Middle Belt. Christian clergy and faithful have also been targeted in cases of kidnapping by armed gangs seeking ransoms. In a speech in the European Parliament, in October 2022, bishop Wilfred Chikpa Anagbe, of the Roman Catholic Diocese of Makurdi, compared the situation of Christians in his country to "nothing short of a Jihad clothed in many names: terrorism, kidnappings, killer herdsmen, banditry, other militia groups" and called on the international community to abandon what he termed a "conspiracy of silence" on the subject.

According to Aid to the Church in Need (ACN), four Catholic priests were murdered in Nigeria in 2022 alone, and 23 priests and one seminarian were kidnapped during the year, or had been kidnapped before but remained in captivity in 2022. The majority of the kidnapped priests were later released, although three were killed and, in November 2022, three were still missing, including Fr John Bako Shekwolo, who was kidnapped in March 2019. A further four nuns were kidnapped in 2022, and released soon afterward. The priests who were murdered were Fr Vitus Borogo, Fr Joseph Bako, Fr John Mark Cheitnum, and Fr Christopher Odia. The Catholic organisation, which has several projects in Nigeria, deplored the wave of violence, saying: "The increase in kidnappings, murders and general violence against civilians, including members of the Catholic clergy in many parts of Nigeria, is a scourge that is yet to be properly addressed by the local authorities". ACN said a further three Catholic clerics were murdered for reasons of persecution in 2023, namely Fr Isaac Achi, seminarian Na'aman Danlami, and Benedictine friar Godwin Eze. During the same year, ACN said, 25 priests or seminarians and three women religious were kidnapped in Nigeria, making it the country with the highest number of Catholic clergy kidnap victims in the world that year. ACN said the number of Catholic priests kidnapped in Nigeria decreased in 2024, but still numbered 14, all of whom were subsequently released, with one other priest murdered.

According to ACN, dozens of Christians were killed by suspected Fulani militants around Christmas time, at the end of 2024 in Benue State. In May 2025, according to ACN, a series of attacks carried out by Fulani herders killed up to 36 Christians, also in Benue and in June up to 200 people were massacred in similar circumstances in the same state. Following three more murders in Benue, according to ACN, the residents of Yelewata blocked roads in protest against government inaction. 2025 also saw a return of mass kidnappings from schools. In one case reported by ACN, in November, 25 girls were kidnapped from Government Girls’ Comprehensive Secondary School in Maga, in Nigeria’s north-western state of Kebbi, and the vice principal was murdered. Though the state is mostly Muslim, according to Aid to the Church in Need, "the district of Danko/Wasagu, where the school is situated, is one of the most religiously diverse enclaves in Kebbi. Several communities in the area are predominantly Christian, making it a rare Christian-majority zone within the Muslim-dominated northwest. For this reason, many of the abducted pupils are Christians, as was the murdered vice principal." The same month, on 21 November, according to ACN, a new raid saw close to 300 people, among students and staff, kidnapped from St. Mary’s Catholic School in Papiri, Diocese of Kontagora. In both cases, all the victims were eventually released.

In December 2025 a report by the Nigerian Catholic Bishops' Conference found that over the past decade at least 212 priests had been kidnapped in Nigeria. According to the document, 183 of these were eventually released, while 12 were kidnapped and three died as a result of their captivity. Four priests were still unaccounted for at the time the study was released. However, according to Aid to the Church in Need, data from 18 dioceses was not included in the report, wherefore the actual number may be higher.

In January 2026, gunmen abducted worshippers from three churches in a remote area of Kaduna State. Nigerian police initially denied the incident but later confirmed the abductions; local residents said that 177 people had been taken, of whom 11 subsequently escaped. In February 2026, gunmen attacked the residence of a Catholic priest in Kauru, Kaduna State, killing three people and abducting Father Nathaniel Asuwaye and several others. On Easter Sunday in April 2026, gunmen attacked two churches in Ariko village, Kaduna State, killing at least five people and abducting dozens of worshippers. The Nigerian army was able to rescue 31 hostages.

In February 2026 the Catholic Secretariat of Nigeria, which is the administrative wing of the Nigerian Bishops' Conference, published a statement criticising the Government for inaction following a wave of violence that left 160 dead and many more abducted in the Middle Belt. "The recurring carnage has become a stain on the conscience of our nation. How can it be justified that, outside of war, over 160 innocent civilians were slaughtered in one coordinated attack in Woro, Kwara State? How do we explain the repeated killings and abductions in Agwara and Tungan Gero in Niger State, the wiping out of entire farming communities in Katsina and Kaduna, and the ongoing violence in Borno? This is not ‘instability’ but a massacre allowed by silence and a betrayal of every Nigerian’s right to live in peace", said the statement, as quoted by Aid to the Church in Need. The article points out that the majority of the victims were not Christians, but Muslims who refused to embrace a radical version of Islam proposed by the terrorists.

== Reactions ==
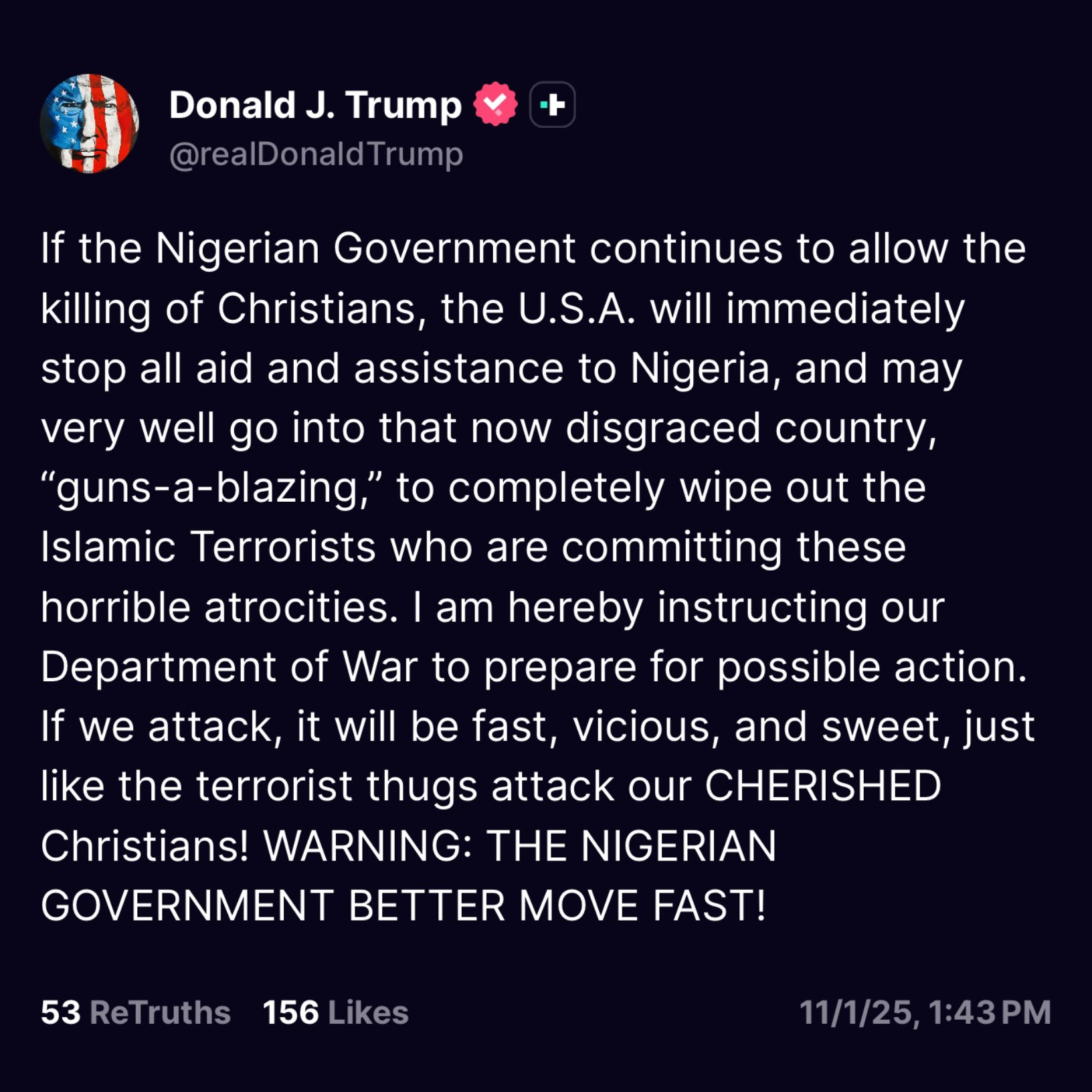
A Truth Social post on November 1, 2025, by President Donald Trump announcing possible military action in Nigeria in response to alleged killings of Christians.

In response to alleged killings of Christians, U.S. President Donald Trump announced on 1 November 2025 that he had directed the Department of Defense to "prepare for possible action" in Nigeria. Trump warned that if the situation persisted, the U.S. would "immediately stop all aid and assistance" and potentially "go into that now disgraced country". This instruction came one day after the U.S. government designated Nigeria as a "country of particular concern" (CPC) for alleged violations of religious freedom. U.S. Secretary of Defense Pete Hegseth confirmed the preparations, stating, "The Department of War is preparing for action". Hegseth added that if Nigeria does not protect its Christian citizens, the U.S. "will kill the Islamic Terrorists" involved. The Nigerian government rejected the accusations. President Bola Tinubu stated that the security challenges affect people "across faiths and regions" and insisted the country practices religious tolerance. An advisor to the president, Daniel Bwala, said Nigeria would welcome US assistance but noted that Nigeria is a "sovereign country" and that the jihadists "had killed people from all faiths, or none". Nigeria's Ministry of Foreign Affairs also affirmed the country's commitment to tackling "violent extremism". The CPC designation had previously been applied by the Trump administration during its first term but was reversed by the Biden administration in 2021. Nigerian humanitarian lawyer Bulama Bukarti described the "Christian genocide" narrative as "dangerous" and "divisive," stating that it was being amplified by figures such as President Donald Trump. According to Bukarti, armed groups in Nigeria target both Muslims and Christians, bombing mosques and churches and attacking civilian locations indiscriminately.

According to a BBC report, groups monitoring the violence stated there is no evidence that Christians are being killed more than Muslims in Nigeria. Regarding clashes in central Nigeria between (mostly Muslim) herders and (often Christian) farmers, human rights groups reported that atrocities have been committed on both sides and that there is no evidence Christians have been disproportionately targeted. Al Jazeera reported that claims of a targeted "Christian genocide" in Nigeria have been disputed by humanitarian analysts and crisis-monitoring organizations. Experts argue that while armed groups like Boko Haram have committed deadly attacks, the violence is more complex and does not exclusively target Christians. Analysts attribute the ongoing violence to a variety of overlapping factors beyond religion. According to a report by the Associated Press, analysts have said that Nigeria's ongoing security crisis does not meet the legal definition of genocide under the United Nations Convention on the Prevention and Punishment of the Crime of Genocide, which defines genocide as acts committed with the intent to destroy, in whole or in part, a national, ethnic, racial, or religious group. Olajumoke Ayandele, an assistant professor at New York University's Center for Global Affairs who specializes in conflict studies, told the AP that the violence in Nigeria represents widespread killings rather than targeted attacks against a specific group, warning that describing the situation as genocide could further heighten tensions. There has been a tendency of "mischaracterisation of the situation as civil conflict". Deutsche Welle reported that narratives such as the so-called "Christian genocide" claim can obscure the complex, overlapping drivers of violence in the country and may weaken interfaith and community-level peacebuilding initiatives. The report cited Samuel Malik, a senior researcher at the pan-African think tank Good Governance Africa, who said that "there is no credible evidence of a state-led or coordinated campaign to exterminate Christians, which is what genocide is."

== ACLED analysis ==
Armed Conflict Location & Event Data (ACLED), a US-based crisis-monitoring group, reported that most victims of jihadist groups like Boko Haram and Islamic State West Africa Province have been Muslims. ACLED reported that, as of 2025, just under 53,000 civilians, comprising Muslims and Christians, had died as a result of targeted political violence from 2009 onward. ACLED research found that of 1,923 attacks on civilians in Nigeria during the year of the report, 50 were targeted based on their religion. Ladd Serwat, a senior Africa analyst at ACLED, noted that claims circulating among some US right-wing groups, such as the assertion that 100,000 Christians had been killed in Nigeria since 2009, are not supported by available data. Serwat identified the causes of the violence as including "conflicts over political power, land disputes, ethnicity, cult affiliation, and banditry." According to a BBC report citing the ACLED, central Nigeria has experienced frequent communal conflicts between predominantly Muslim herders and largely Christian farmers. The clashes are often driven by disputes over access to resources such as water and pasture. These disputes have escalated into cycles of retaliatory violence that have killed thousands, with atrocities committed by both sides. ACLED's 2022 report shows that despite Christians making up about 50% of the population, only 5% of violence targeted them for religious reasons.

== See also ==
- Islamic extremism in Northern Nigeria
- List of massacres in Nigeria
- Religion in Nigeria
- Sharia in Nigeria
- Timeline of Boko Haram insurgency

== Sources ==
- "Curbing Violence in Nigeria (II): The Boko Haram Insurgency" (PDF). Africa Report (216). Brussels: International Crisis Group. 3 April 2014. Archived from the original (PDF) on 17 January 2016.
- "Watchmen of Lake Chad: Vigilante Groups Fighting Boko Haram" (PDF). Africa Report (244). Brussels: International Crisis Group. 23 February 2018. Archived from the original (PDF) on 11 March 2022.
- TRADOC G-2 (2015). Threat Tactics Report: Boko Haram (PDF). Fort Eustis: United States Army Training and Doctrine Command.
- Warner, Jason; Hulme, Charlotte (2018). "The Islamic State in Africa: Estimating Fighter Numbers in Cells Across the Continent" (PDF). CTC Sentinel. 11 (7). West Point, New York: Combating Terrorism Center: 21–28. Archived from the original (PDF) on 2019-08-08.
