= 1882 in Denmark =

- Decades: 1860s; 1870s; 1880s; 1890s; 1900s
- See also: Other events of 1882; List of years in Denmark

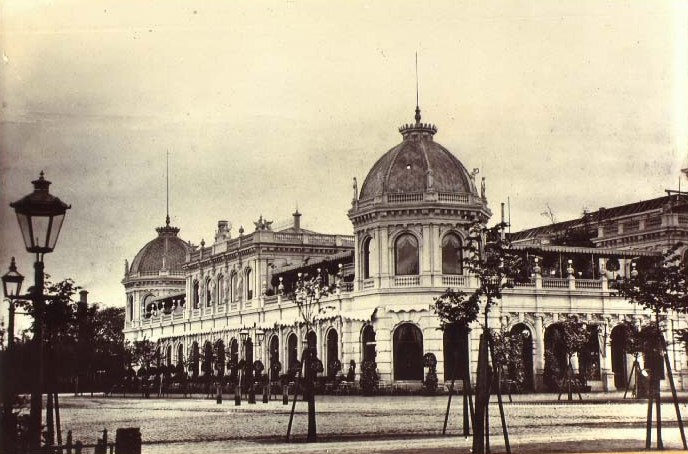

Events from the year 1882 in Denmark.

== Incumbents ==
- Monarch – Christian IX
- Prime minister – J. B. S. Estrup

== Events ==
January

- 2 January – FLSmidth, a supplier of cement production technology, is founded by Frederik Læssøe Smidth as a small "technical bureau" based in a single room of his mother's apartment.
- 10 June – Hjedding Dairy is established as Denmark's first cooperative dairy.

April

- 20 April – The Thy Railway between Strier and Thisted is inaugurated.

May

- 1 May – Helsingør Shipyard is founded by Mads Christian Holm.
- 6 May – The North Sea Fisheries Convention is signed by Denmark, Germany, Great Britain, France, Belgium and the Netherlands.

November

- 5 November – Carl Jacobsen's sculpture collection, which later forms the basis of the Ny Carlsberg Glyptotek, is opened to the public in his winter garden.

December

- 16 December – Kemp & Lauritzen us founded in Copenhagen.

=== Undated ===
- A group of dissatisfied students from the Royal Danish Academy of Fine Arts founds the Artists' Studio School as a reaction to the outdated teachings at the Academy.
- The Society for Denmark's Neutralization is founded.

== Culture ==
=== Art ===
- The Thorvaldsen Exhibition Medal is awarded to Vilhelm Rosenstand for the painting Outside a Brasserie in Paris. Mother and Son at Café Pousse, Frants Henningsen for A Funeral and Peder Severin Krøyer.

== Births ==
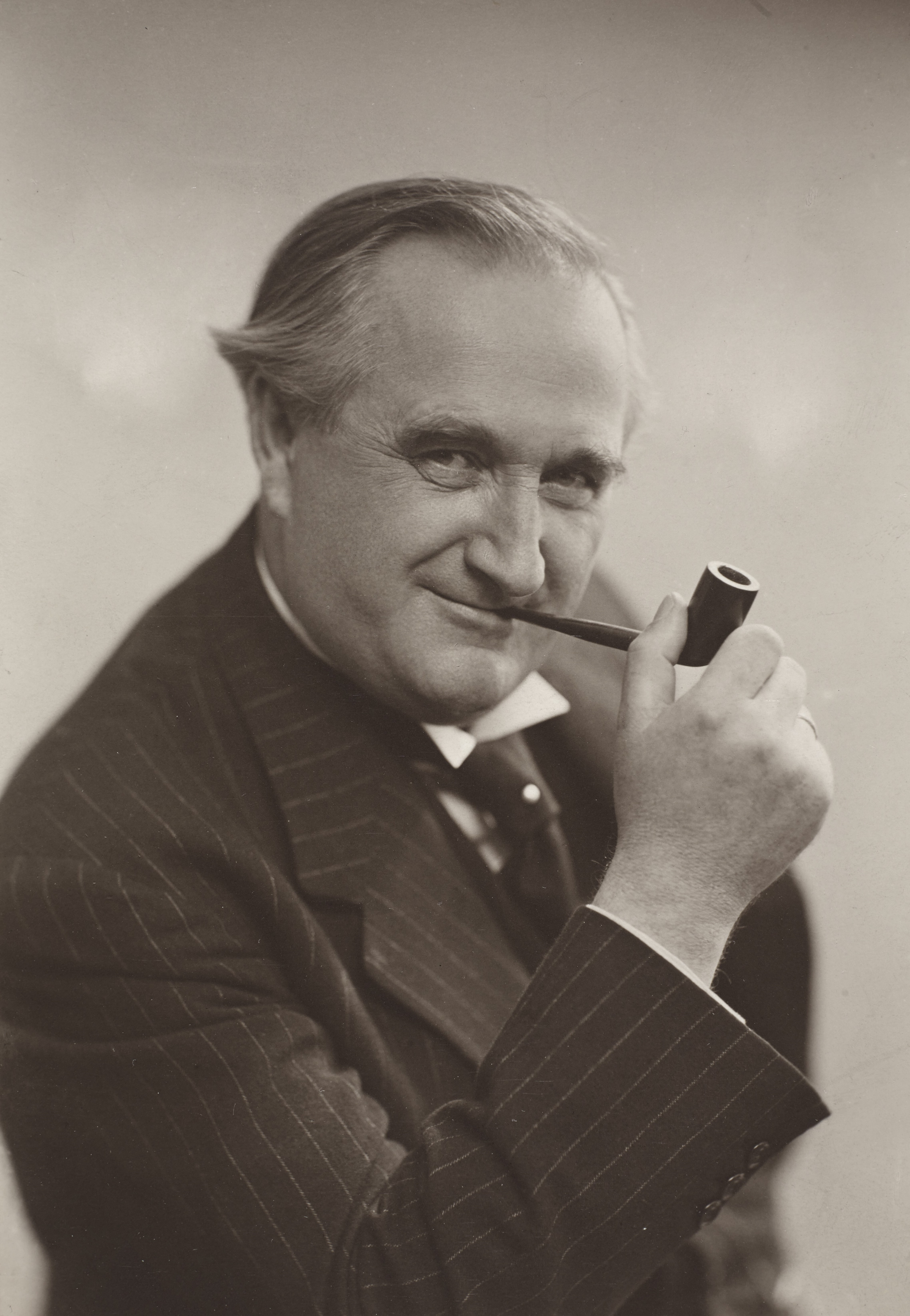
Robert Storm Petersen.

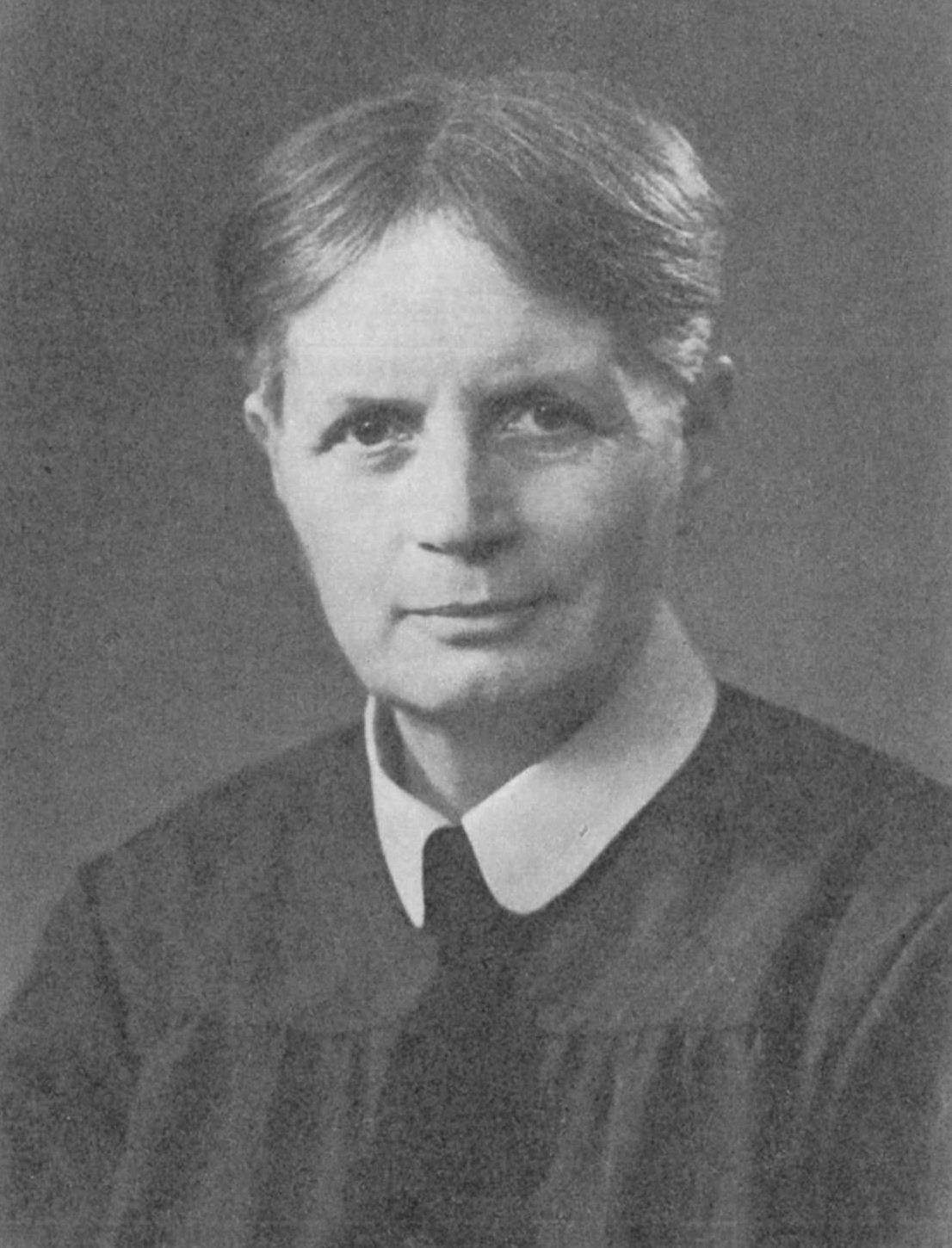
Karen Callisen.

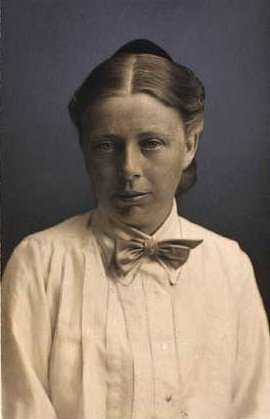
Maria Nielsen.

=== January–March ===
- 5 January – Niels Hoegh Bronnum, missionary and physician (died 1966)
- 12 January – Christian Christensen (author), writer (died 1960)
- 11 February – Knud V. Engelhardt, industrial designer (died 1931)

=== April–June ===
- 5 April – Karen Callisen, geologist (died 1970)
- 11 April – Ellen Aggerholm, actress (died 1968)
- 24 April – Robert Schmidt, actor (died 1941)
- 25 April – Christian Mortensen, world's oldest man of his day (died 1998)
- 2 May – Sophus Black, telegraph manager and art collector (d. 1960)
- 7 May – Thorvald Niss, painter (died 1905)
  - 11 May – Elna Pandurom actress and operetta singer (died 1983)
- 20 May – Sigrid Undset, writer (died 1940 in Norway)
- 5 June – Battling Nelson, boxer (died 1945 in the United States)
- 27 June – Christian Debois, composer (died 1960)
- 26 June – Julie Marstrand, sculptor (died 1943)

=== July–September ===
- 12 July – Maren Sørensen, Denmark's first female priest (died 1957)
- 17 August – Tom Robinson, swimming coach (died 1958 in the United States)
- 19 September – Robert Storm Petersen, cartoonist, painter, humorist, writer (died 1949)
- 20 September – Maria Nielsen, historian and educator (died 1931)

=== October–December ===
- 1 October – Maria Mogensen, curator and egyptologist (died 1932)
- 16 November – Kai Nielsen, sculptor (died 1924)
- 28 December – Lili Elbe, painter (died 1931 in Germany)

== Deaths ==
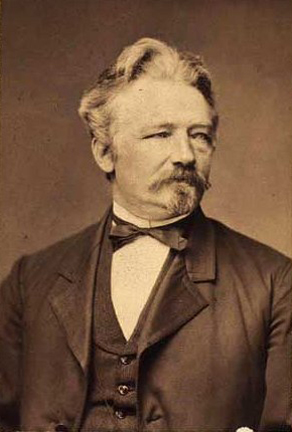
Hans Jørgen Hammer.

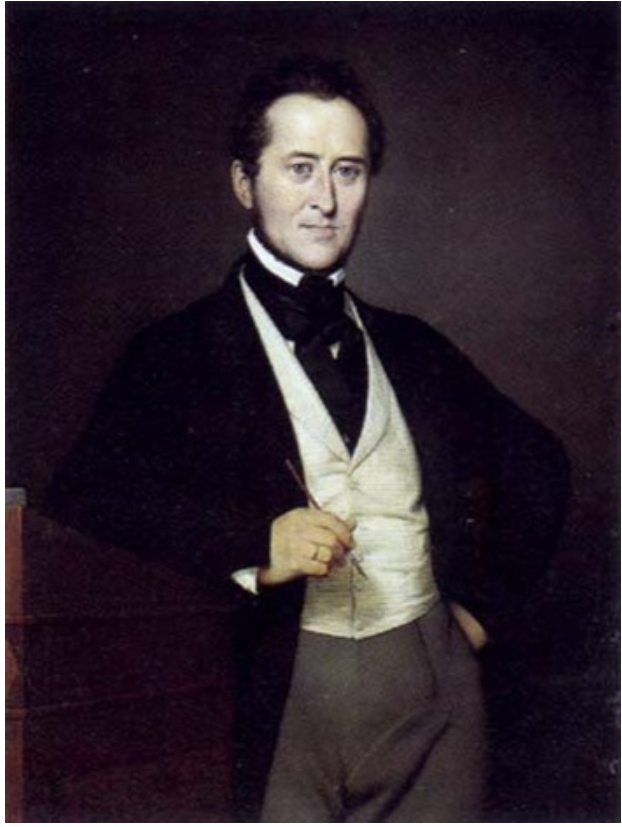
Wilhelm Wanscher.

=== January–March ===
- 9 January – Gotthold Müller, army officer (born 1795)
- 28 January – Hans Jørgen Hammer, painter (born 1815)

=== April–June ===
- 21 April – Balthazar Christensen, jurist and politician (born 1802)
- 6 June – Tagea Brandt, philanthropist (born 1948)

=== July–September ===
- 1 July – Peter Raadsig, painter (born 1806)
- 14 August – Niels Christian Kierkegaard, draftsman and lithographer (born 1906)

=== October–December ===
- 6 October – Vilhelm Melbye, painter (born 1824)
- 18 October – Albert Heinrich Riise, pharmacist, rum manufacturer (born 1810)
- 23 October – Johannes Theodor Reinhardt, zoologist (born 1816)
- 4 December – Wilhelm Wanscher, businessman and art collector (born 1802)
