= 1970 in Denmark =

- Decades: 1950s; 1960s; 1970s; 1980s; 1990s
- See also: Other events of 1970; List of years in Denmark

Events from the year 1970 in Denmark.

== Incumbents ==
- Monarch – Frederik IX
- Prime minister – Jens Otto Krag

== Events ==
- 2 February – An unofficial 24-hour strike closed all Danish shipyards. The strikers were demanding a one krone an hour increase in wages to compensate for tax increases.
- 6 February – A further 24-hour unofficial strike in the Danish shipyards to protest at the forced resignation of 26 union stewards that had organised the 2 February strike.
- 1 April – The 1970 Danish Municipal Reform reduces the number of municipalities from 1,098 to 277 and the number of counties from 25 to 14. The reform also abolishes the last privileges for market towns.
- 17 August – The University of Copenhagen hosts the opening meeting of the 4th Archeological Congress in Copenhagen.

== Sports ==
- 4 July – Mogens Frey wins stage 8 of the 1970 Tour de France.
- 3–6 September – Jørgen Engelbrecht and Niels Henry Secher win gold in M2x at the 1970 World Rowing Championships-

== Births ==
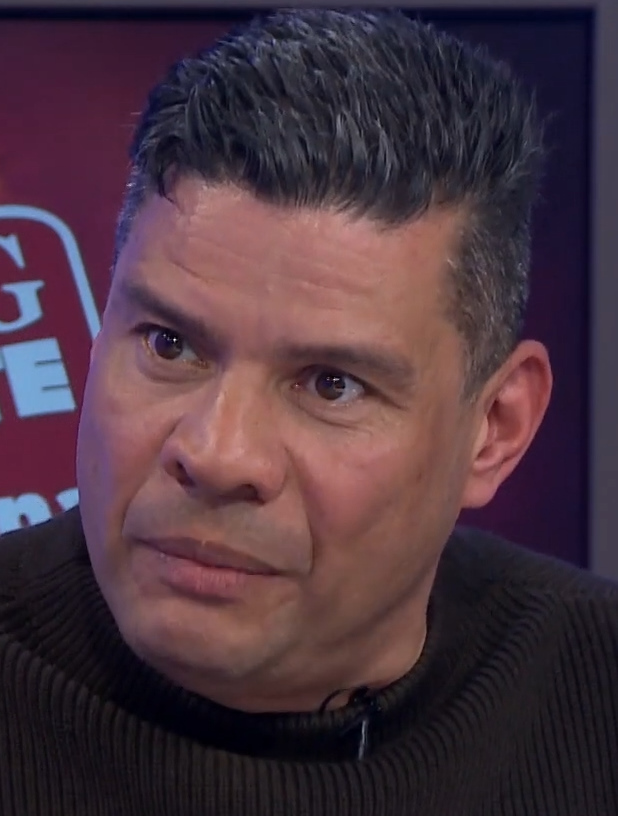
Vincent F. Hendricks.

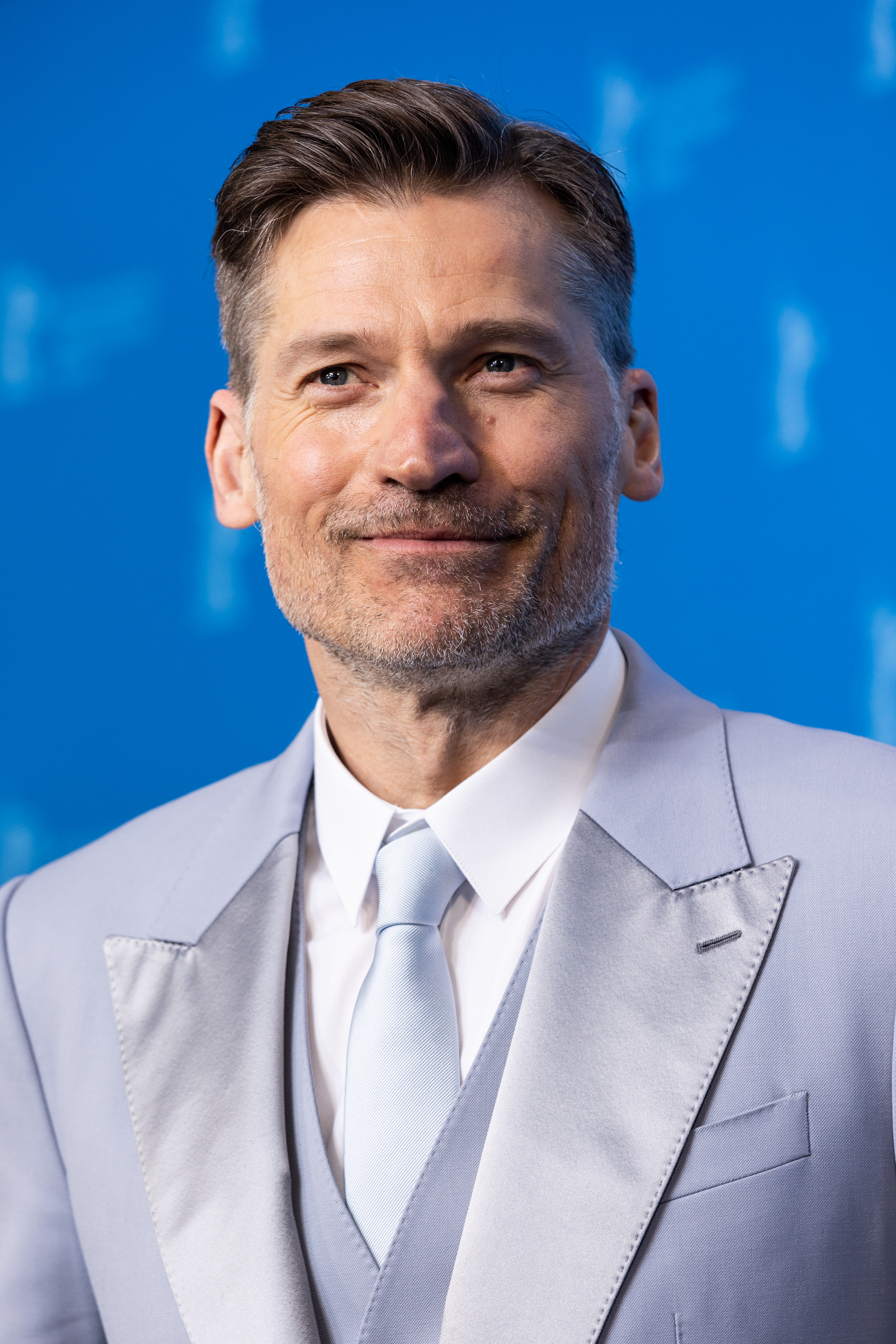
Nikolaj Coster-Waldau.

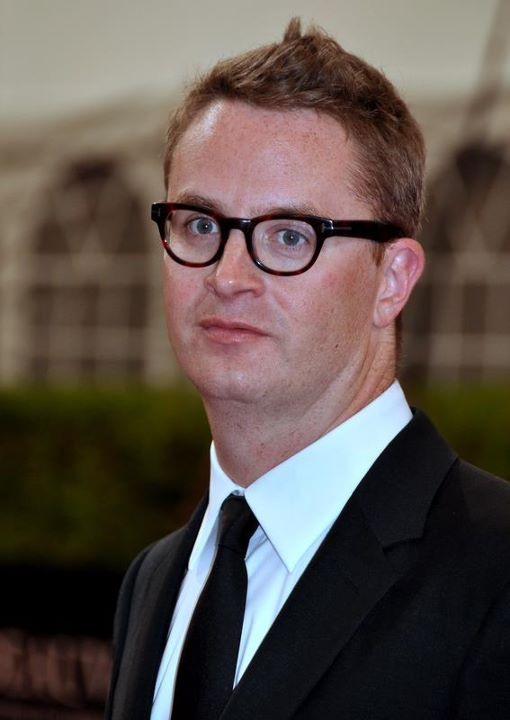
Nicolas Winding Refn.

=== January–March ===
- 15 January – Sine Bundgaard, opera singer
- 6 February – Per Frandsen, footballer and manager
- 24 February – Jason Watt, racing driver
- 6 March – Vincent F. Hendricks, philosopher

=== April–June ===
- 11 April – Whigfield, musical artist
- 25 May – Maibritt Saerens, actress
- 5 June – Claus Norreen, musician

=== July–September ===
- 11 July – Frederik Fetterlein, tennis player
- 20 July – Mette Blomsterberg, pastry cook and television personality
- 27 July – Nikolaj Coster-Waldau, actor and screenwriter
- 4 August – Benny Engelbrecht, politician
- 18 September – Alexandra Mousavizadeh, economist, business executive
- 29 September – Nicolas Winding Refn, film director

=== October–December ===
- 5 November – Niels Frederiksen, football manager
- 20 November – Princess Alexandra of Sayn-Wittgenstein-Berleburg
- 28 November – Jens Martin Skibsted, designer
- 17 December – Christina Markus Lassen, diplomat
- 28 December – Jean-Charles Ellermann-Kingombe, diplomat

== Deaths ==
=== January–March ===
- 4 January – Prince Viggo (76), equestrian sportsman (born 1893)
- 17 January – Karen Callisen, geologist (born 1882)
- 19 February – Aage Leidersdorff (59), fencer (born 1910)
- 28 February – Vermund Larsen, businessman, company founder (born 1909)

=== April–June ===
- 14 June – Frederik Marcus Knuth (taxonomist) and count of Knuthenborg (born 1904)

=== October–December ===
- 4 October – Christian Thomas, gymnast (born 1896)
- 3 November – Fleming Lynge, screenwriter (born 1896)
- November 30 – Vagn Bennike (82), Army engineer and second world war resistance leader in Jutland (born 1888)

== See also ==
- 1970 in Danish television
