= Lutheran Church of Christ in Nigeria =

Denomination of the Lutheran church in Nigeria

The Lutheran Church of Christ in Nigeria
- Logo of the LCCN
- Classification: Protestant
- Orientation: Lutheran
- Leader: Archbishop Musa Filibus
- Associations: Lutheran World Federation
- Region: Nigeria
- Origin: 1913; 113 years ago Numan
- Branched from: Sudan United Mission - Danish Branch
- Congregations: 2,400
- Members: 2,200,000
- Hospitals: One Referral Center at Demsa
- Tertiary institutions: 1 (Bronnum Lutheran Seminary Mbamba, Yola South Adamawa State)
- Official website: lccn.org.ng

The Lutheran Church of Christ in Nigeria (LCCN) is a major Lutheran denomination in Nigeria, a member of the Lutheran World Federation (LWF).

It was established as an independent church in 1913 from the Sudan United Mission, Danish Branch, known today as Mission Afrika. The LCCN now has 2,200,000 members in over 2,400 congregations nationwide. Members of the Lutheran Church of Christ in Nigeria are among the Christians and members of other religious groups being persecuted by Boko Haram, an Islamic terrorist organization.

The archbishop of the LCCN, Dr Musa Filibus, was elected to become the 13th president of the LWF on 14 May 2017 at Safari Hotel in Windhoek, Namibia during the 12th Assembly of the LWF.

== History ==
The Sudan United Mission, Danish Branch first sent missionaries to Africa in 1913 with the pioneers being Niels Hoegh Brønnum, his wife Margaret C. Young, and Dagmar Rose. Brønnum's wife died shortly after arriving and Rose brought back the Brønnum's infant son to Europe. Brønnum continued his work and established a mission in Numan.

The mission eventually expanded and in 1948, the first five indigenous Nigerian pastors were ordained. By 1955, it was known as the Lutheran Church of Christ in the Sudan and in 1956 became independent as the Lutheran Church of Christ in Nigeria with Pilgaard Pedersen as its first president (Hausa: Ekkilisiyan Kristi a Nijeriya Lutheran). In 1960, Akila Todi was elected the first indigenous Nigerian president of the Church. He was made bishop in 1973 when the church adopted a modified episcopal polity.

== Structure ==
The LCCN is led by an archbishop and is further divided into nine dioceses, each led by a bishop. The headquarters of the LCCN is in Numan. The current archbishop is the Most Revd Musa Panti Filibus PhD.

=== Dioceses ===
- Abuja Diocese

Bishop: The Rt Revd Benjamin Fuduta
Congregations in the city of Abuja, Federal Capital Territory, Gombe State, Plateau State, Bauchi State, Niger State, Oyo State, Lagos State and Edo State

- Arewa Diocese

Bishop: The Rt Revd Amos B. Elisha
Congregations in Northern Adamawa State

- Bonotem Diocese

Bishop: The Rt Revd Solomon Nuhu
Congregations in southern Adamawa State

- Gongola Diocese

Bishop: The Rt Revd Peter Bartimawus PhD
Congregations in Northwestern Adamawa State

- Mayo-Belwa Diocese

Bishop: The Rt Revd Zethan L. Gajere
Congregations in Southern Adamawa State

- ShallHolma Diocese

Bishop: The Rt Revd Dimga Jones Kadabiyu
Congregations in North Eastern Adamawa State

- Todi Diocese

Bishop: The Rt Revd Clement Dogo
Congregations in North-Central Adamawa State

- Taraba Diocese

Bishop: The Rt Revd Timothy Warimi
Congregations in North Eastern Taraba State

- Yola Diocese

Bishop: The Rt Revd Theopilus Shedrach
Congregations in Central Adamawa State

=== Presidents and Archbishops of the LCCN ===
When the LCCN was established in 1956, the title of the head of the Church was president. The title was changed to bishop in 1973 and with the establishment of diocesan bishops within the LCCN, the title was again changed to archbishop in 1997.

- 1956-1960

Rev Pilgaard Pedersen

- 1960-1987

Rev Akila Todi
Title changed to bishop in 1973

- 1987-2002

The Most Revd David Windibiziri
Title changed to archbishop in 1997

- 2002–2017

The Most Revd Nemuel A. Babba

- 2017–present

The Most Revd Dr Musa Panti Filibus (also known as Filibus Musa)

== Affiliations ==
The LCCN participates in ecumenical work through its affiliation with:

- Lutheran World Federation
  - Lutheran Communion in Central and Western Africa
- Christian Association of Nigeria
- Christian Council of Nigeria
- Fellowship of Churches of Christ in Nigeria
- Joint Christian Ministry in West Africa

The LCCN also works in partnership with:

- Evangelical Lutheran Church in America
- Minneapolis Area Synod of the ELCA
- Global Health Ministries
- Mission Afrika

== See also ==
- Christianity in Nigeria
- Theological College of Northern Nigeria
