= Vermund =

Vermund is a given name or surname. Notable people with the name include:

== Given name ==
- Vermund Larsen (1909–1970), Danish furniture designer and manufacturer.

== Surname ==
- Pernille Vermund (born 1975), Danish politician
- Sten H. Vermund, American pediatrician and epidemiologist
