= Kronprinsessegade 38 =

Historic building in Copenhagen, Denmark

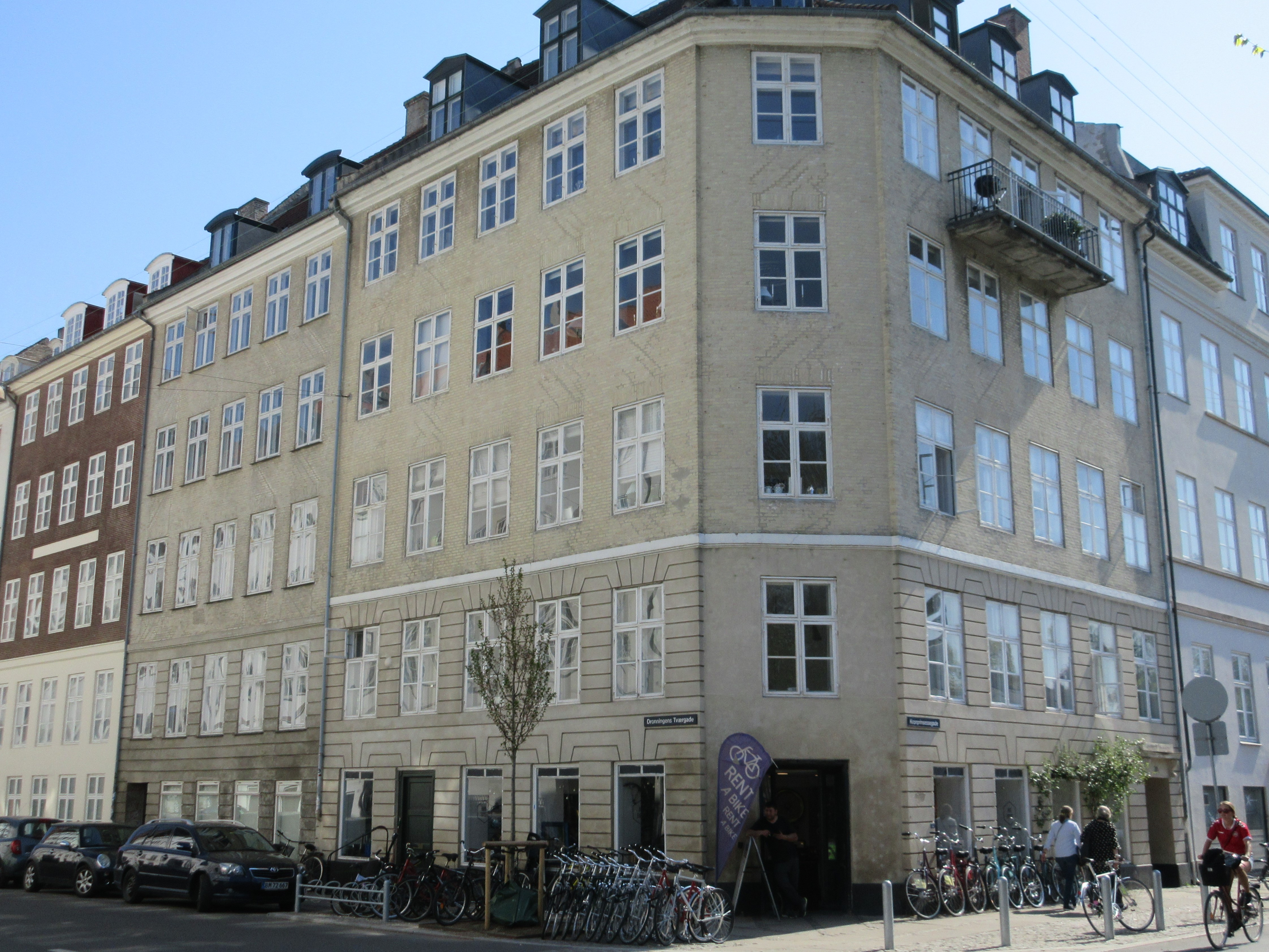

General information
- Location: Copenhagen, Denmark
- Coordinates: 55°41′5.08″N 12°34′57.59″E
- Completed: 1806

Kronprinsessegade 38 is a listed building located at the corner of Kronprinsessegade and Dronningens Tværgade in central Copenhagen, Denmark. It was listed in 1945 on the Danish registry of protected buildings and places. Notable former residents include the politician C. G. Andræ, educator Natalie Zahle and painter Vilhelm Rosenstand.

== History ==
=== Early history ===
The building was constructed by Bloms Enke & Sønner in 1803–06. The property was listed in the new cadastre of 1806 as No. 400 in St. Ann's West Quarter.

Lars Peter Hedermann, a krigsråd, resided on the second floor at the 1834 census. He lived there with his wife Sophie H. Hedermann (née Lange), two sons (aged 13 and 20) and one maid.

=== 1840s ===
De Hamilton, widow of an admiral, resided on the first floor with her 19-year-old daughter and one maid at the 1840 census. Johan Peter Jacobsen, a military surgeon, resided on the second floor with his wife Christine Jacobsen, their son Emilie Jacobsen and one maid. H. F. v. Mack Ene, a captain in the 1st Jutland Infantry Regiment, resided on the third floor with his wife Emilie v. Mack Ene and one maid. Ludvig von Kellner, a captain in the Engineering Corps, resided on the fourth floor with his wife Elise v. Kellner, their three children (aged one to six), his sister Sopie Kellner, his sister-in-law Harriet Zuber, and two maids. Jens Lauritsen Lohr, a grocer (urtekræmmer), resided on the ground floor with his wife Christiane Lohr, a grocer's apprentice, one male servant and one maid.

The property was again home to five households at the 1845 census. Christ. Fr. Christiani, a krigsråd on paid leave from Generalstaben, resided on the first floor with his wife Helene Cath. Colding, their 25-year-old daughter Sophie Charlottle Emilie, and one maid. Carl Georg Andræ, a captain in Generalstaben, resided on the second floor with his wife Hansine Pauline Schack, their two children (aged one and two) and two maids. Adolf Frederik Bergsøe, a jurist at the University of Copenhagen, resided on the third floor with his wife Christiane Marie Seidelin, and one maid. Ludvig Stepan Kellner, a captain in the Engineering Corps, resided on the fourth floor with his wife Augusta Sophie Elisab. Kellner (née Zuber), their six children (aged two to 11), his sister Sophie Elisabeth Christiane Kellner, his wife's sister Anna Frederikke Theresia Harriett Zuber, and two maids. Jens Lauritzen Lohr, a grocer (urtelræmmer), resided on the ground floor with his wife Christiane Lohr, two male servants and one maid.

The mathematician and later politician C. G. Andræ (1812–1893) lived in the building from 1843 to 1846. Natalie Zahle, founder of N. Zahle's School, lived in the building from 1852 to 1856. The painter Vilhelm Rosenstand lived on the second floor in 1891–1892.

=== 20th century ===
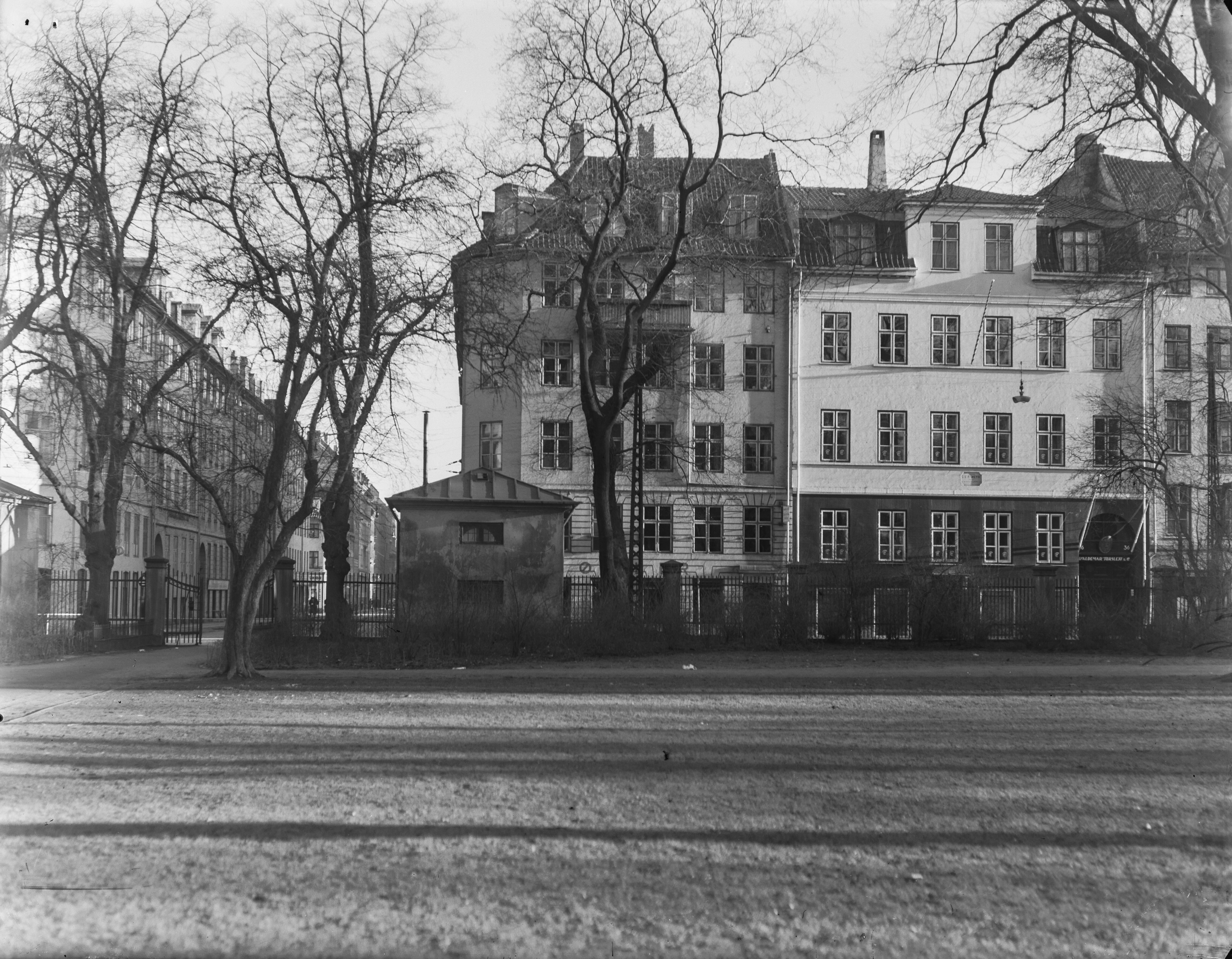
Kronprinsessegade 37 in c. 1940.

The property belonged to editor Asger Kristian Karstensen (1874–?) in 1908. He was the publisher of the magazine Unio and also worked for Nationaltidende. In 1896–98, he had been the editor of Tidens Krav.

The landowner and politician Johan Knudsen (1865–1942) had his city home in the building in about 1938.

== Architecture ==
The building consists of four storeys over a high cellar. It has five bays towards each street as well as a chamfered, recessed corner bay.
