= Panduro =

Panduro may refer to:

- Panduro, Bolivia, a canton in the province of Aroma, La Paz Department
- Elna Panduro (1882–1983), Danish actress
- Lorenzo Hervás y Panduro (1735–1809), Spanish Jesuit and philologist
- Leif Panduro (1923–1977), Danish novelist and dramatist

== See also ==
- Pandura, an ancient string instrument
