= Musa Filibus =

Nigerian archbishop (born 1960)

The Most Rev. Dr. Musa Filibus
- 13th President of Lutheran World Federation (LWF)
- Church: Lutheran
- Archdiocese: Nigeria
- Province: North East, Nigeria
- Diocese: Mayo Belwa
- Elected: 13 May 2017
- Installed: 2017
- Term ended: 2023
- Predecessor: Munib Younan
- Successor: Henrik Stubkjær
- Previous posts: Lecturer Bronnum Lutheran Seminary, Yola, Adamawa State, Nigeria (1993) Provost (1998 - 2002) Area Secretary for Africa, Department for Mission and Development LWF ( 2002 - 2010) Director, Department for Mission and Development LWF (2010 - 2013) Deputy General Secretary, LWF (2012 - 2013) Bishop, Mayo Belwa Diocese (2013 - 2016) Archbishop LCCN (2017 - date)

Orders
- Ordination: 1994
- Consecration: 2013
- Rank: Archbishop

Personal details
- Born: 1960 (age 65–66) Yolde Gubudo, Mayo Belwa, Adamawa State, Nigeria
- Education: PhD in Philosophy, Luther Seminary, St. Paul, Minnesota
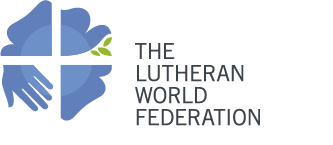
- Coat of arms: Musa Filibus's coat of arms

Musa Panti Filibus (born in 1960) is a Nigerian Archbishop of the Lutheran Church of Christ in Nigeria (LCCN) and president of Lutheran World Federation (LWF). Elected at the LWF 12th Assembly in Windhoek, Namibia 13 May 2017, Archbishop Panti Filibus is the 13th president and second from Africa to head Lutheran World Federation's highest authority established in 1947 to oversee the church with about 72 million members in 147 countries. After his election, he led a delegation of seven Regional Vice-presidents to meet Pope Francis, the head of the Roman Catholic Church to strengthen relationship between the two churches. Archbishop Filibus told the Catholic pontiff that the past 50 years of improved relationship in worship had seen a departure “from conflict to communion”. Pope Francis who had in 2015 participated in the Lutheran Church 500th anniversary of reformation in Sweden urged LWF delegation to continue on the road of reconciliation to full unity.

In 2002, Filibus was the area secretary for Africa in the Department for Mission and Development (DMD) working with several churches under Mission Africa until 2010, when he was elevated to the position of Director of DMD. He was consecrated the first bishop of his local diocese of Mayo Belwa in Nigeria's north east state of Adamawa in 2013 after its creation at the peak of violent campaign against Christians by Islamist extremist Boko Haram that led to a forced closure of several churches in the area. In 2016, he was elected the Archbishop of the Nigeria church. Archbishop Filibus is noted for his humility, sympathy for the poor, commitment to interfaith relationship and peace, gender equality and spartan life style. For instance, in spite being the leader of the Lutheran World Federation, Filibus still maintains his small cathedral residence in Numan, north east Nigeria where there are frequent clashes between sedentary farmers and nomadic herders. In November 2017, dozens were reportedly killed in the area in a clash between farmers and herders but Filibus choose to stay helping victims of the attacks. His life style is a sharp contrast to many Nigerian clergy men who live in opulence flaunting private jets.

== Humanitarian work ==
Archbishop Filibus is recognised as a strong voice against modern day slavery, human trafficking, irregular migration, oppression and injustice of all forms which is rife in his home country Nigeria and other African countries and helping those on the margin of society, weak and tired without a voice find voice and hope. In 2017 he led a joint effort of the Lutheran Church of Christ in Nigeria, LCCN and Lutheran World Federation, LWF to found a non-governmental organization – Symbols of Hope whose focal objective is to create awareness against human trafficking and irregular migration especially of Nigerians traveling through Sahara Desert crossing Mediterranean Sea en-route Europe under inhuman conditions. Extreme poverty and internal conflict are cited as key factors that increase vulnerability to trafficking in Nigeria. Ranked 32 out of 167 countries according to the 2018 Global Slavery Index, Nigeria remains a source of transit and destination country for human trafficking. In August 2019, Archbishop Filibus launched interfaith network to bring people of different faith together to help victims of modern-day slavery find hope and confidence for the future.

== Development of the church in Nigeria ==
Archbishop Filibus in February 2019 saw the need for the LCCN to have a standard media to serve its information needs, thus started Reformation Tabloid – a monthly publication of the Lutheran Church of Christ in Nigeria to help spread the gospel through the print. The Newspaper was publicly unveiled by Nigerian Vice President, Yemi Osinbajo at the 2019 annual convention of the church in Demsa, Adawama state of Nigeria. At the same convention he flagged off the building of LCCN mega convention ground after obtaining approval from the government of Adamawa State. In May 2019 Dr Filibus launched a ‘strategic plan’ for the development of the church in Nigeria. Archbishop Filibus in 2019 told a large gathering of LCCN that he was leading efforts to establish a University known as the Lutheran University of Nigeria (LUN) in Adamawa state, "to produce people with integrity, that would govern the country in future".

== Climate change campaign ==
Archbishop Filibus is a climate change campaigner and desert encroachment ravaging northern Nigeria- an agriculture-heavy region. Filibus has often said the issue of climate change and desertification is very important to him and the Lutheran church and often uses the pulpit to enlighten locals on the impact of illegal logging, bush burning, use of woods as source of energy for domestic cooking on the environment while teaching them to adopt climate friendly activities such as planting of trees to protect the environment. During the Lutheran Church of Christ in Nigeria, LCCN 2019 annual convention, Filibus in a major speech called on Nigerian government senior officials which included the vice President, Yemi Osinbajo, Secretary to the government of Nigeria, Boss Mustapha and Jubrila Bindow the governor of north eastern state of Adamawa who were present at the convention to convey the climate message to Nigerian government to speed up action against climate change and desertification in northern Nigeria to ease hardship. The economy of northern Nigeria largely depends on agriculture but many of them are peasant farmers and herders who have increasingly watched as their farmlands are encroached by desert, and crops and pastures get dried up causing more hardship to people who are already impoverished. Lake Chad which provides a source of livelihood to hundreds of agrarian communities has shrunk by 90 percent, going from 25,000 km2 in 1963 to less than 1,500 km2 in 2001. Climate change has been partly blamed for farmers-herders conflict in Nigeria due to struggle over diminishing land resources.
