= Skirmish of Århus =

1849 battle of the First Schleswig War

Skirmish of Aarhus
- Part of the First Schleswig War
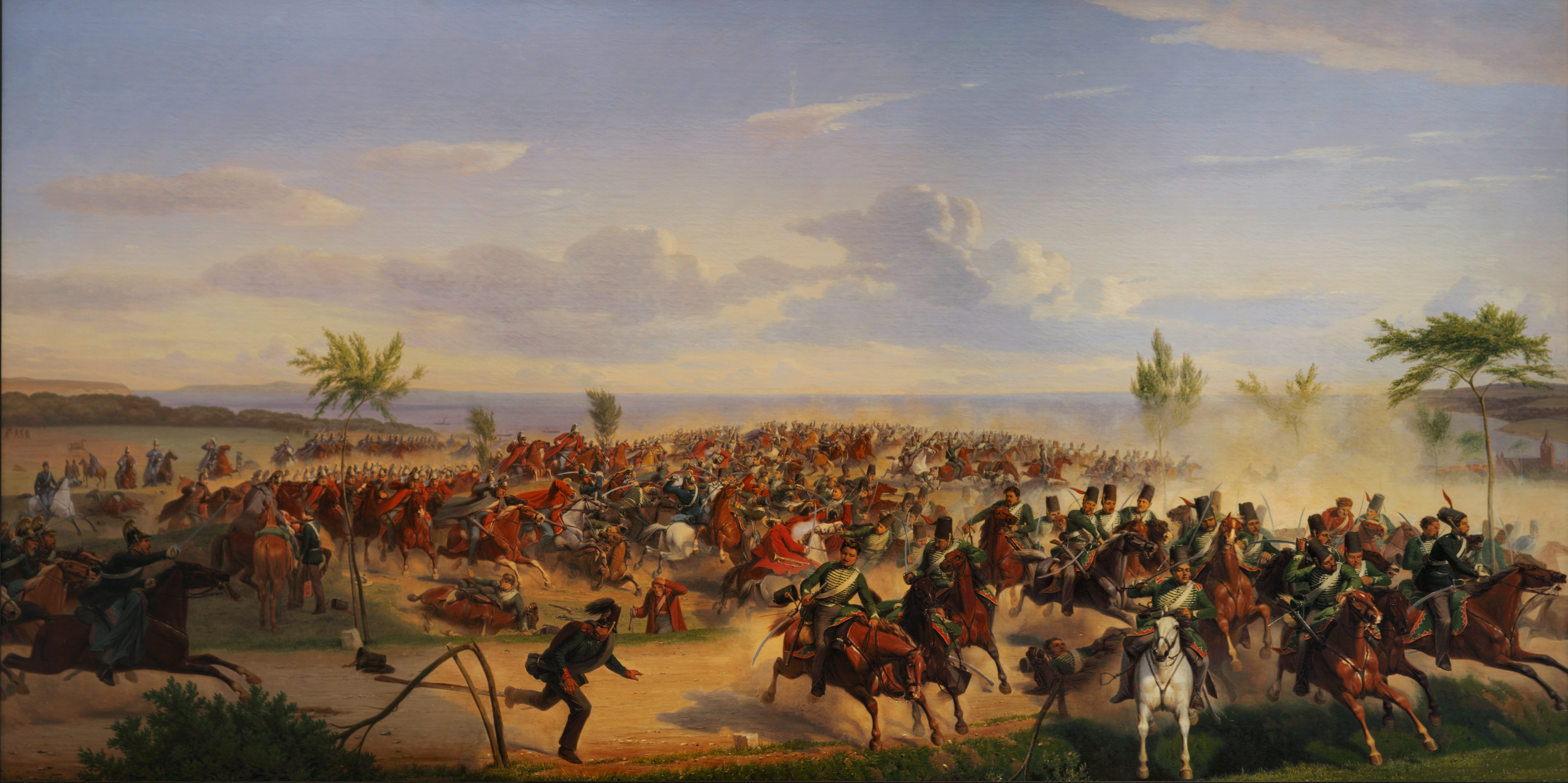
- Rytterkampen ved Aarhus by Jørgen Sonne
Date	31 May 1849
Location	Vejlby 2 km (1.2 mi) north of Aarhus 56.193471°N 10.201914°E
Result	Danish victory

Belligerents
Prussia	Denmark

Commanders and leaders
(Kingdom of Prussia) Constantine Alexander of Salm-Salm	(Denmark) Olaf Rye (Denmark) Gotthold Møller

Strength
16,000	18,000

Casualties and losses
2 killed 23 wounded 25 captured	2 killed 5 wounded 4 captured

Skirmish of Århus or Rytterfægtningen on 31 May 1849 was a skirmish during the First Schleswig War between Denmark and Prussia under the German Confederation, a few kilometers north of the city of Aarhus, Denmark. The skirmish was a Danish victory that stopped the Prussian advance through the peninsula of Jutland at the city of Aarhus.

== Memorials ==
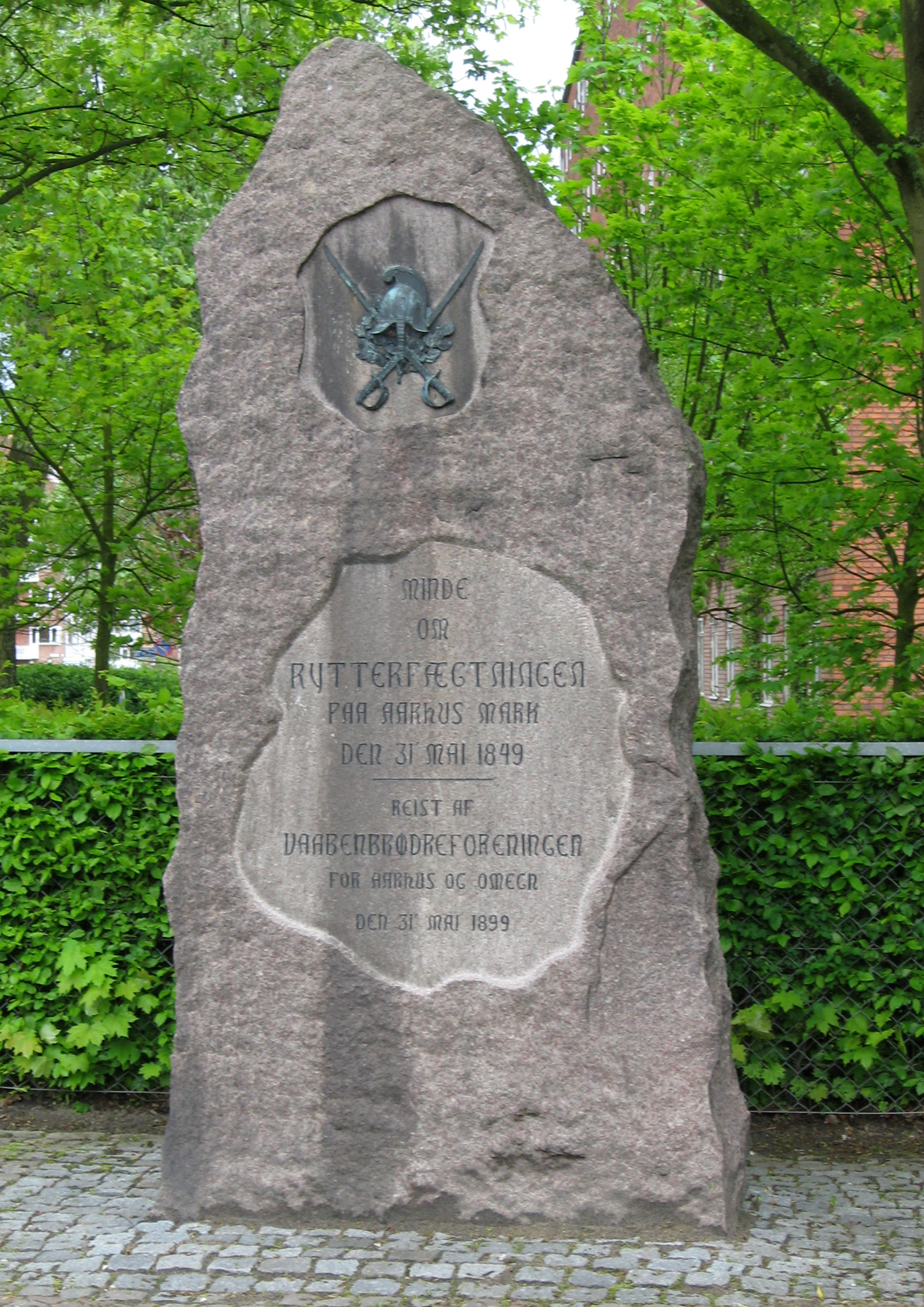
The memorial stone.

On the intersection of Trøjborgvej and Nørrebrogade a 10-foot engraved stone memorializes the skirmish.

== Background ==
Beginning with the Battle of Bov the First Schleswig War had seen a number of battles take place in Southern Jutland until a truce was signed in August 1848. The truce lasted 8 months but in March 1849 fighting recommenced and the Danish army eventually retreated north through Jutland. The Danish army was split in three corps; one fortified at Dybbøl and another around Fredericia while the third, Nørrejyske Armékorps led by general Olaf Rye, moved to Helgenæs north of Aarhus with the goal of drawing German forces north and delay it while the army was concentrated and reinforced by sea at Fredericia. In late May lead elements of the Prussian forces reached Aarhus.

== The battle ==
Initially the Danish garrison, commanded by Gotthold Møller, retreated from Aarhus without a fight as they had been ordered to not defend the city, for fear of the destruction it might inflict on the city. The Prussian forces entered the city on 29 May but abandoned it again later that day and Danish forces re-entered the city. The Danes placed a small force consisting of a company of infantry and half a squadron of cavalry as a tentative defence. On 30 May, Prussian forces advanced again and retook the city, capturing a number of prisoners in the process.

Pursued by Prussian troops, the Danish garrison withdrew north towards the Riis Forest which was defended by a battalion of infantry and a squadron of cavalry. The cavalry squadron attacked the advancing Prussian troops, driving them back to the Randersvej road, before they were compelled to retire. At this time two squadrons of Danish cavalry under Captain S. C. Barth on a reconnaissance mission from Helgenæs arrived and charged the Prussian infantry line from north to south along Randersvej.

The advancing Danish cavalry reached a hill west of Riis Skov when two German squadrons counter-attacked from the south and from Hasle in the west, resulting in a hectic cavalry skirmish. Elements of the Danish force were sent back to Vejlby to take up defensive positions which was misinterpreted as a general retreat and the Prussian infantry advanced north-west, bypassing the Danish forces at Riis Forest. At this time Danish reinforcements arrived from the north and the Prussian forces now found themselves both outnumbered and surrounded, forcing a retreat back to occupied Aarhus.

== Aftermath ==
The Prussian forces retreated and did not advance to retake Aarhus again until 20 June. The goal of drawing German forces north and delaying had been accomplished and the corps was eventually shipped out from Helgenæs to Fredericia where it participated in the breakout on 6 July.
