= 1970 in Danish television =

This is a list of Danish television related events from 1970.

== Births ==
- 12 June – Natasja Crone Back, journalist & TV host
- 9 July – Lai Yde, actor

== See also ==
- 1970 in Denmark
