= Ellen Aggerholm =

Danish actress (1882–1963)

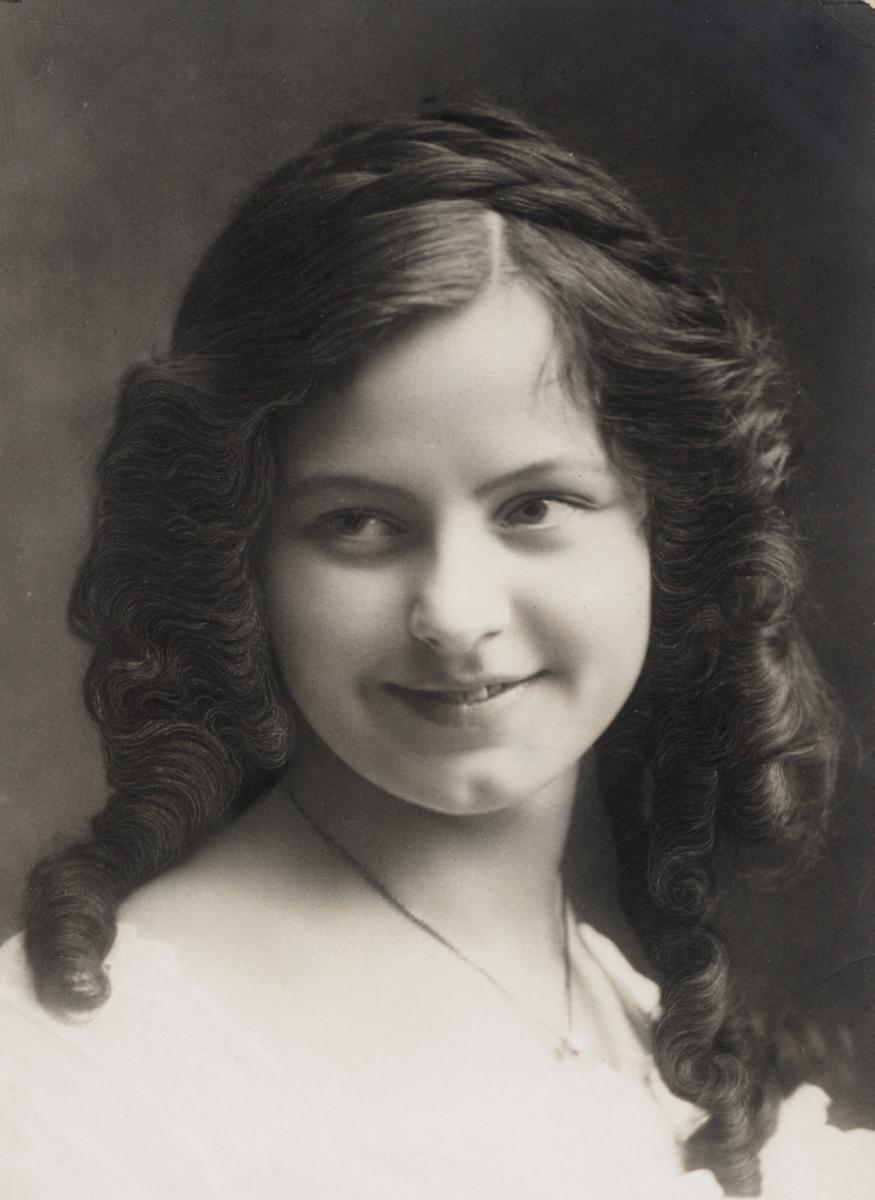
- Born: Ellen Abrahams; 11 April 1882; Copenhagen, Denmark
- Died: April 11, 1963 (aged 81); Copenhagen, Denmark
- Occupation: Actress
- Years active: 1901 — 1947
- Spouse: Svend Aage Alexandre Reumert Aggerholm
- Parent: Carl (Charles) Julius Sophus Abrahams
- Relatives: Severin Abrahams

Ellen Aggerholm née Abrahams (11 April 1882 – 11 April 1963) was a Danish stage and screen actress. She made her debut in Attester at Copenhagen's Folketeatret in 1901. In 1911, she moved to London where she first played Puck in Shakespeare's A Midsummer Night's Dream at Her Majesty's Theatre. She returned to Denmark when war broke out in 1914, touring with her husband's company until 1917. She then joined the Odense Theatre where she became the principal actress until 1924. She went on to tour the provinces until she performed in repertoire at the Casino Theatre in Copenhagen. After a long career, she retired from the stage in 1947. While young, Aggerholm performed a number of leading roles in mainly short silent films released by Nordisk Film from 1910 to 1915.

== Biography ==
Born in Copenhagen on 11 April 1882, Ellen Abrahams was the daughter of the architect Carl (Charles) Julius Sophus Abrahams (1838–1893) and his wife Vilhelmine née Petersen (1852–1930). In June 1903, she married the actor Svend Aage Alexandre Reumert Aggerholm (1875–1940).

As the niece of the theatre director Severin Abrahams (1843–1900), she grew up in a theatrical environment. After studying drama under the actors Emanuel Larsen and Johannes Nielsen, she made her debut on 22 September 1901 at the Folketeatret in Alfred Tofft's Attester. She was particularly successful as Käthie in Wilhelm Meyer-Förster's Hans Højhed which was presented over 100 times from 1903 to 1906. She and her husband Svend continued acting at Folketeatret, Frederiksberg Teater and Det Ny Teater until 1910 when they both moved to London.

In 1910, together with her husband Ellen Aggerholm moved to London where she first performed at the Prince of Wales Theatre before taking the role of Puck in A Midsummer Night's Dream at the prestigious His Majesty's Theatre the following year. Other roles included Kate in Hall Caine's The Manxman and Glory in his The Christian. She also sang in various London cabarets. When war broke out in 1914, the couple returned to Denmark. After touring the Danish provinces, when her husband became director of the Odense Theatre in 1917, she performed repertory taking roles as the leading actress. While touring with Thorvald Larsen's troupe in 1923, she gained considerable success as Margarete in Goethe's Faust. She was then engaged by Copenhagen's Casino Theatre where she played the title role in Kameliadamen. She later toured with Axel Illum's company. Her later performances were at the Frederiksberg Theatre until she retired in 1947.

While young, Aggerholm performed a number of leading roles in mainly short silent films released by Nordisk Film from 1910 to 1915.

Ellen Aggerholm died in Roskilde on 11 April 1963 and was buried in Copenhagen's Vestre Cemetery.
