= Gotthold Müller =

Danish military officer (1795–1882)

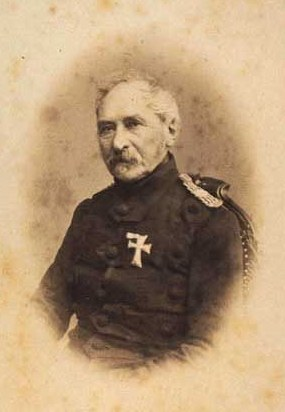
Gotthold Müller Credit: J.E. Bøgh

Frederik Gotthold Møller (von Müller; 17 June 1795 – 9 January 1882) was a Danish officer and courtier, father to Othar Müller.

== Background ==
Gotthold was a son of the parish priest in Fjellerup parish Thomas Høeg Christophersen Møller (baptized 22 January 1755 – 1 February 1802) and Dorothea Kallager (baptized 15 July 1764 - 30 December 1839, married second time 1 April 1803 with Hans Severin Engelbrecht Bentzon ca. 1760–1822). The wealthy father left in 1798 and moved to Copenhagen, where he died in 1802.

== During the Napoleonic wars ==
The bustling and busy military life in the capital after 1801 left Gotthold wanting to be a soldier. When he was 13 he got into Frikorporalinstituttet, where he in 1810 departed as a second lieutenant in Prince Frederik Ferdinand's Dragoon regiment. The regiment was made in 1807 and didn't yet have a permanent garrison, but just stayed around the country, where Müller led an enjoyable, unbounded life, that soon continued beyond Zealand, without it leading to a serious fight. In December 1813 the regiment combined with the Kolding reserve corps, where Prince Charles of Hesse-Kassel took them down to Flensburg; but shortly after it had to march back to the army on Funen at the king's command. In 1814 the regiment went to Southern Jutland to protect Charles XIV with other troops. After a short stay in Zealand, the regiment marched out to occupy France, but was stopped already at Bremen and had to move the regiment back to Holstein. At the end of 1815, Gotthold got 5000 extra Danish troops, that occupied northern France until autumn in 1818. Before the home march back to Denmark, Gotthold married the daughter of Gen. Caspar Friedrich von Gähler, which got him in a high social position.

== Participation in the First Schleswig War ==
After coming back home from France, Müller had a calm period in the regiments first garrison in Aarhus, until he in 1833 became an adjutant of Ferdinand. He was interrupted during his time as a courtier by several trips, including to look over troop exercises in Odessa, Lüneburg and Baden, but mostly through his participation in the First Schleswig War. He became a colonel of Olaf Ryes Corps. He was present as a colonel at the Battle of Kolding (1849) and the Skirmish of Århus.

== After the First Schleswig War ==
After the war Gotthold went back to Ferdinand and was also the Chief of Staff at the Zealand General Command. In 1851 he became a part of the Order of the Dannebrog. By appointment to major general in 1856, he got the first Cavalry Brigade.

== Sources ==
- Müller, Gotthold i Dansk Biografisk Leksikon.
- Museum, 2 (1894).
- Militært Repertorium, 4 (1838)
- Tidsskrift for Krigsvæsen (1856).
- Thomas Hansen Erslew, Almindeligt Forfatter-Lexicon for Kongeriget Danmark med tilhørende Bilande fra 1814 (under Møller).
- Georg Søndergaard, Bogen om personnavne (1997)
- (All sources are in Danish)
