= Sine Bundgaard =

Danish opera singer

Sine Merrild Bundgaard (born 15 January 1970) is a Danish soprano. She was born in Aarhus. Educated at the Royal Danish Academy of Music and the Danish Opera Academy, she debuted in 1999 at the Royal Danish Theatre in the role of Barbarina in Mozart’s The Marriage of Figaro. She has appeared in many European opera houses, including the Paris Opera, the Bavarian State Opera (Munich) and the Drottningholm Palace Theatre (Stockholm).

She was hired as an opera soloist at the Royal Danish Theatre in 2009 and has since, among other roles, appeared as Michaëla in Georges Bizet’s Carmen, Pamina in The Magic Flute, the title role in Alban Berg’s Lulu, Juliette in Charles Gounod’s Roméo et Juliette, Nedda in Ruggero Leoncavallo’s Pagliacci and Donna Elvira in Mozart's Don Giovanni.

== Awards ==
In 2004 the Danish Broadcasting Corporation chose her as its artist of the year. In 2005 she received the Aksel Schiøtz prize, and in 2006 the Elisabeth Dons memorial award. In 2011 she was nominated for the Reumert prize for her singing performances in Lulu and in Roméo et Juliette, and in 2013 she was recognized as a Knight of the Dannebrog.
