= Vincent F. Hendricks =

Danish philosopher

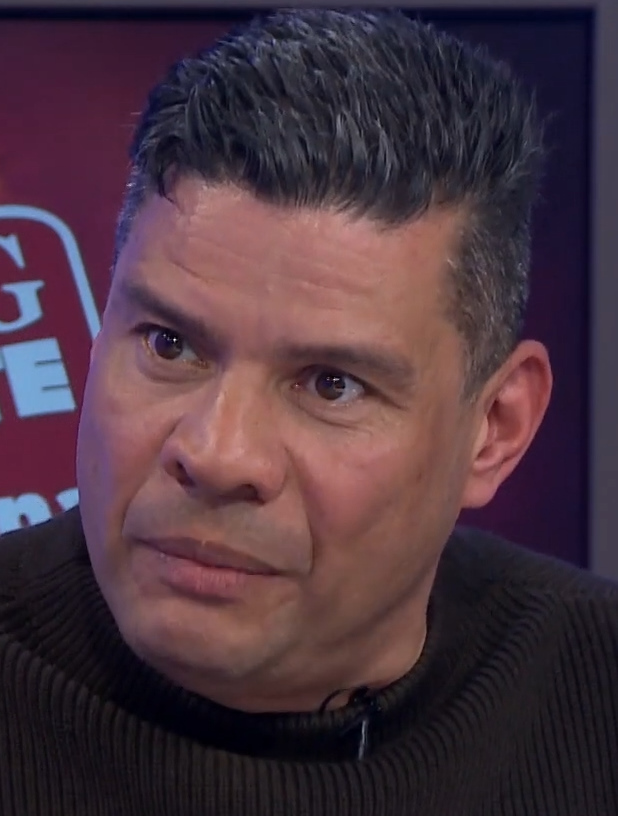
Vincent Hendricks in March 2020

Vincent Fella Rune Møller Hendricks (born 6 March 1970) is a Danish philosopher and logician. He holds a doctoral degree (PhD) and a habilitation (dr.phil) in philosophy and is Professor of Formal Philosophy and Director of the Center for Information and Bubble Studies (CIBS) at University of Copenhagen, Denmark. He was previously Professor of Formal Philosophy at Roskilde University, Denmark. He is member of IIP, the Institut International de Philosophie in Paris.

== Work ==
Hendricks's work deals with modern mathematical and philosophical logic and concentrates primarily on bringing mainstream and formal approaches to epistemology together—from epistemic reliabilism, counterfactual epistemology and contextualism to epistemic logic, formal learning theory and what is called 'modal operator epistemology'. Modal operator epistemology, developed first by Hendricks in The Convergence of Scientific Knowledge (Dordrecht: Springer, 2001), since developed further in a number of papers and books – see in particular Mainstream and Formal Epistemology (New York: Cambridge University Press, 2006, winner of CHOICE Outstanding Academic Title 2006) – is the cocktail obtained by mixing alethic, tense and epistemic logic with elements from formal learning theory in order to study the limiting validity of convergent knowledge.

Vincent F. Hendricks is editor-in-chief of Synthese Library and New Waves in Philosophy, he is also the first founder of ΦLOG – The Network for Philosophical Logic and Its Applications and chief editor of ΦNEWS – The Newsletter for Philosophical Logic and Its Applications.

In 2008, Vincent F. Hendricks was awarded the Elite Research Prize by the Danish Minister of Science, Technology and Innovation and HRH Crown Princess Mary. In 2008 he was awarded the Roskilde Festival Elite Research Prize.

== Controversies ==
In 2012, Hendricks attracted criticism from some philosophers for doing a photo shoot that depicts young women dressed in sexy school uniforms in a classroom setting and presenting it on his web site. Hendricks later withdrew the pictures from his web site and apologized. The photos were taken as part of a charity drive arranged by a Danish-language charity "Youmeshopping".

== Authored and edited books ==
- Nobody Cares - The Philosophy of Indifference [third installment of Zero-Sum Empire: Zero-Sum Empire: From Egoism to Mass Indifference] (New York: Springer Nature, 2026)
- Sucker Nation - The Philosophy of Trading Wits for Vanity [second installment of Zero-Sum Empire: Zero-Sum Empire: From Egoism to Mass Indifference] (New York: Springer Nature, 2026)
- Olie og vand: Kan demokratiet overleve tech? [med Mikkel Møller-Sørensen] (Copenhagen: Ræsons Forlag, 2026)
- Meningen med det hele og andre filofabula [med Zakiya Ajmi] (København: Gads Forlag / Børnebøger, 2026)
- Feilinge und Gauner, Unsichtbare Feinde - wie Mitläufertum und Egoismus unser Denken vergiften (Berlin/Wien: Goldegg Verlang, 2025)
- Whataboutmeism: Insights from Game Theory, Behavioral Economics and Moral Philosophy, [first installment of Zero-Sum Empire: Zero-Sum Empire: From Egoism to Mass Indifference] (New York: Springer Nature, 2025)
- DET HELT NØDVENDIGE: Om at finde livets balancepunkt (København: Politikens Forlag, 2025)
- Fra Kant til Steen: En samtale om skolens raison d'etre, [with Bjarke M. Jensen] (København: Hans Reitzels Forlag / Gyldendal, 2024)
- NOK OM MIG, hvad med dig, hvad synes du om mig (København: Politikens Forlag, 2023)
- The Ministry of Truth: BigTech's Influence on Facts, Feelings and Fictions [with Camilla Mehlsen] (New York: Springer Nature, 2022)
- Sandhedsministeriet: Techplatformenes indflydelse på tidens fakta, følelser og fortællinger [med Camilla Mehlsen] (København: Informations Forlag, 2021)
- Vend Verden: Genvind autonomien i en digital tidsalder (København: Politikens Forlag, 2020)
- Hovedbrud: Naturvidenskab og filosofi [med Johan Olsen] (København: Gads Forlag, 2020)
- Reality Lost: Markets of Attention, Manipulation and Misinformation [with Mads Vestergaard] (New York: Springer Nature, 2019)
- Postfaktisch: Die neue Wirklichkeit in Zeiten von Bullshit, Fake News und Verschwörungstheorien [with Mads Vestergaard] (München: Blessing Verlag / Penguin Books - Random House, 2018)
- Kæmp for kloden: Når politik, videnskab og erhvervsliv sammen tager ansvar [med Claus Strue Frederiksen] (København: Gyldendal, 2018)
- Introduction to Formal Philosophy [edited with Sven Ove Hansson and Esther Michelsen Kjeldahl] (Dordrecht: Springer, 2018)
- FAKE NEWS: Når virkeligheden taber [with Mads Vestergaard] (København: Gyldendal, 2017)
- Spræng boblen: Sådan bevarer du fornuften i en ufornuftig verden (København: Gyldendal, 2016)
- Infostorms: How to take Information Punches and Save Democracy (New York: Copernicus Books / Springer, 2014)
- Social Epistemology: 5 Questions, edited with Duncan Pritchard (Automatic Press / VIP, 2015)
- A Formal Epistemology Reader (Dordrecht: Springer, 2015)
- Handbook of Formal Philosophy (Dordrecht: Springer, 2015)
- Epistemic Logic: 5 Questions (New York: Automatic Press / VIP, 2010)
- Blackwell Companion to Philosophy of Technology (Oxford: Blackwell, 2009, 2012)
- Thought 2 Talk: A Crash A Course in Reflection and Expression (New York: Automatic Press / VIP, 2006)
- Mainstream and Formal Epistemology (New York: Cambridge University Press, 2006, winner of CHOICE Outstanding Academic Title 2006)
- Formal Philosophy (New York: Automatic Press / VIP, 2005)
- Masses of Formal Philosophy (New York: Automatic Press / VIP, 2006)
- Game Theory: 5 Questions (New York: Automatic Press / VIP, 2007)
- Philosophy of Mathematics: 5 Questions (New York: Automatic Press / VIP, 2007)
- Probability and Statistics: 5 Questions (New York: Automatic Press / VIP, 2008)
- Epistemology: 5 Questions (New York: Automatic Press / VIP, 2008)
- The Convergence of Scientific Knowledge (Springer, 2001)
- Feisty Fragments (London: King's College Publications, 2004)
- Logical Lyrics (London: King's College Publications, 2005)
- 500 CC: Computer Citations (London: King's College Publications, 2005)
- Self-Reference (CSLI Publications, 2006)
- 8 Bridges Between Formal and Mainstream Epistemology, Philosophical Studies, March 2006
- Ways of Worlds I, Studia Logica, April 2006
- Ways of Worlds II, Studia Logica, November 2006
- Interactions: Physics, Mathematics and Philosophy, 1840-1930 (Dordrecht: Springer, 2006)
- New Waves in Epistemology (New York: Palgrave MacMillan, 2007)
- Proof Theory (Dordrecht: Springer, 2001)
- Probability Theory (Dordrecht: Springer, 2002)
- Knowledge Contributors (Dordrecht: Springer, 2003)
- First-Order Logic Revisited (Berlin: Logos Verlag 2004)
- The Way Through Science and Philosophy: Essays in Honor of Stig Andur Pedersen (London: College Publications, 2006)
- Modern Elementary Logic [in Danish] (Copenhagen: Hoest and Soen, 2002, 2nd revised edition, 2011)
- Tal en Tanke [in Danish] (Copenhagen: Forlaget Samfundslitteratur, 2007)
- Et spadestik dybere [in Danish] (Copenhagen: dk4 forlag, 2008)
- Vincent vender virkeligheden [in Danish] (Copenhagen: Automatic Press / dk4 forlag, 2009)
- Fortsat: flere klummer [in Danish] (Copenhagen: dk4 forlag, 2010)
- Oplysningens blinde vinkler: En åndselitær kritik af informationssamfundet [in Danish] (Copenhagen: Forlaget Samfundslitteratur, 2011)
- NEDTUR! Finanskrisen forstået filosofisk [in Danish] (Copenhagen: Gyldendal Business, 2012)
- Kampagner: Klummer og kampråb [in Danish] (Copenhagen: Automatics Press / dk4 forlag, 2013)
