= Vermund Larsen =

Danish furniture designer and manufacturer

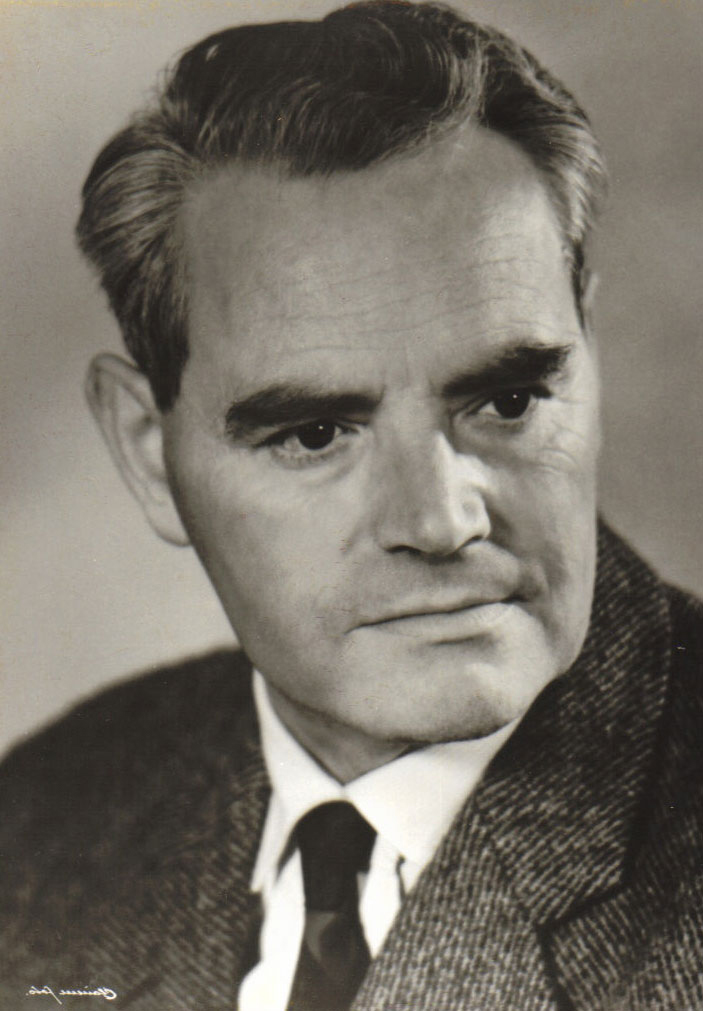
- Photograph portrait of Vermund Larsen, circa 1955.
- Born: 27 February 1909; Hellerup, Denmark
- Died: 28 February 1970 (aged 61); Aalborg, Denmark
- Education: Aalborg Cathedral School
- Occupation: Architect
- Practice: Manufacturer and designer
- Projects: 1944 Patent for window-lock with security.; 1956 Nr. 1100 (design); 1955 Producer of Europes first glass fiber chair produced in one pour.; 1962 first one worldwide to use a gas spring to adjust the seating height.; 1964 VL118 (design); 1966 VL66 (design)

Vermund Larsen (27 February 1909 – 28 February 1970) was a Danish furniture designer and manufacturer. Larsen became known for his work while living in Aalborg, an industrial city in northern Denmark. Larsen is best known for creating Europe's first glass–fiber chair in 1955.

== Early life ==
Vermund Larsen was born in 1909 in Hellerup, a suburb of Copenhagen, Denmark. Larsen moved to Aalborg at age 14 when his father, Captain S. K. Larsen, served in the Danish military in Aalborg. After studying at Aalborg Cathedral School, Larsen became a trainee at M. Kragelund Factories. He then served in the military. Upon completing his service at age 26, he bought P.C. Petersen, an abandoned iron production company, in 1935. At P.C. Petersen, Larsen began working with steel and became interested in steel furniture manufacturing. In 1944, Larsen invented and patented a window lock. The lock was child-proof and had a feather mechanism that theoretically could not be drilled through, thereby making it resistant to break-ins.

== Career ==
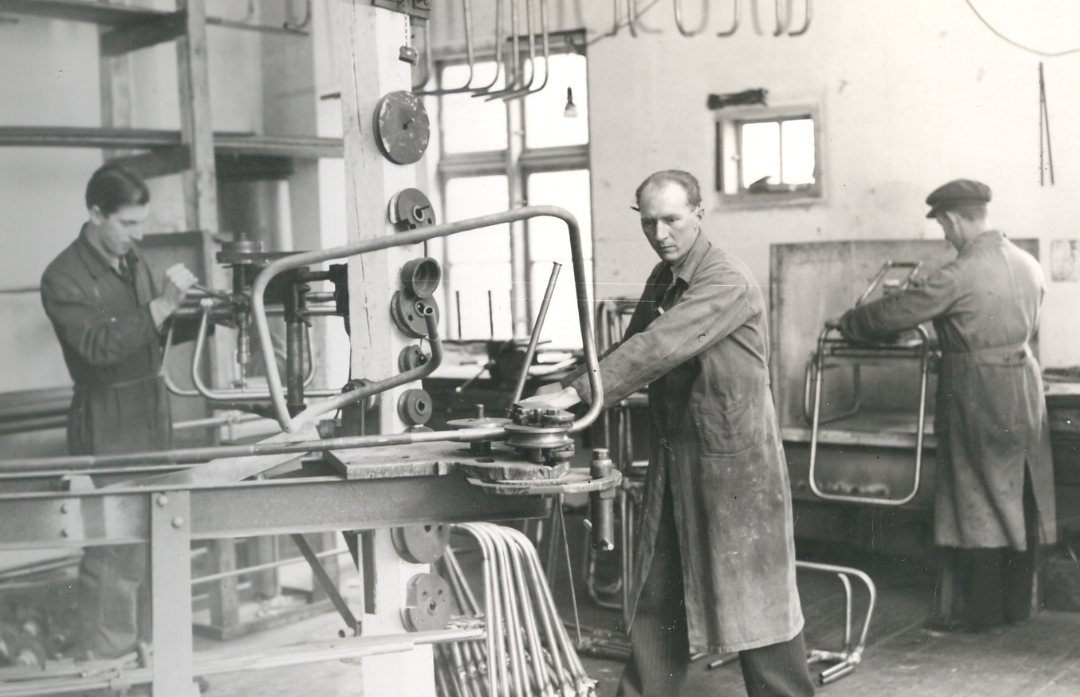
Picture from the production when the factory was in Fjordgade in Aalborg – start of the 1940s

In 1948, Larsen began to focus on the construction of office furniture. Larsen took an interest in office chairs after reading an article in the Journal of Danish Handcraft entitled "The Seated Position – and Chairs" by Dr. Snorason. The article discussed ergonomics and the importance of furniture that supports proper sitting posture.

Larsen then began designing and manufacturing ergonomic desk chairs. In 1951, production consisted of the following categories: barber chairs, helmsman seats and ship Equipment for, among others the Cargo liner, MS Hans Hedtoft, and office furniture, such as the Ideal A Chair.

== Notable accomplishments ==
- 1948–Holmegaard glass competition and Danish Cabinetmakers Guild award
- 1955–Europe's first fiberglass chair produced in one pour with Ib Kofod-Larsen
- 1956–Design for the so-called "No. 1100" also called the stacking chair
- 1960–Design for the new Falck straps for Danish ambulances
- 1960s–Supplied all conductor seats to the Hamburg Hochbahn
- 1962–First to use a gas cartridge on a chair for height adjustment
- 1964–Design of "118", later VL118
- 1966–Design of "VELA Lux", later VL66.
- 1969–50% of all sales went to export

== Death ==
Vermund Larsen died in Aalborg in 1970. His twin sons, Stig and Gorm, ran the company under the name VELA.

== Gallery ==
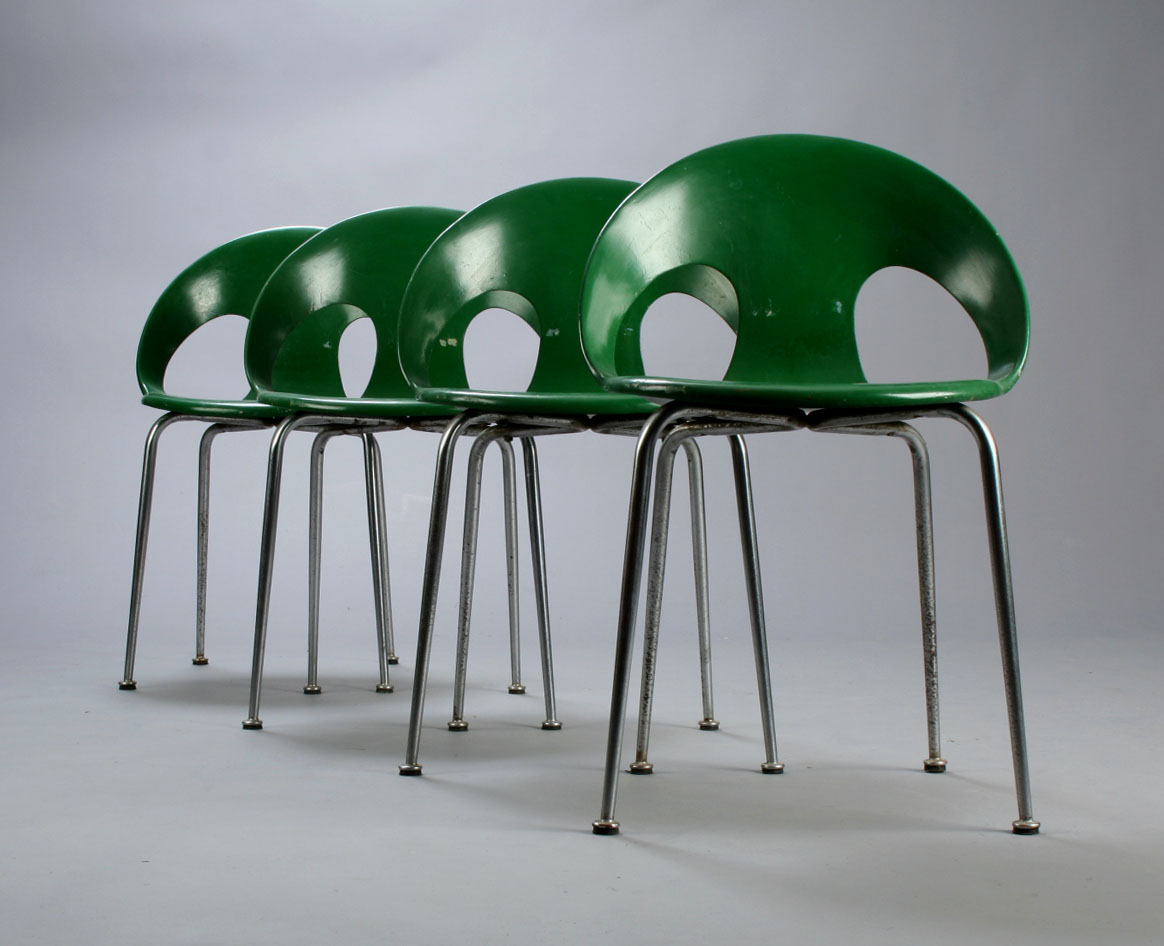
Nr. 1100 designed by Vermund Larsen in 1956.

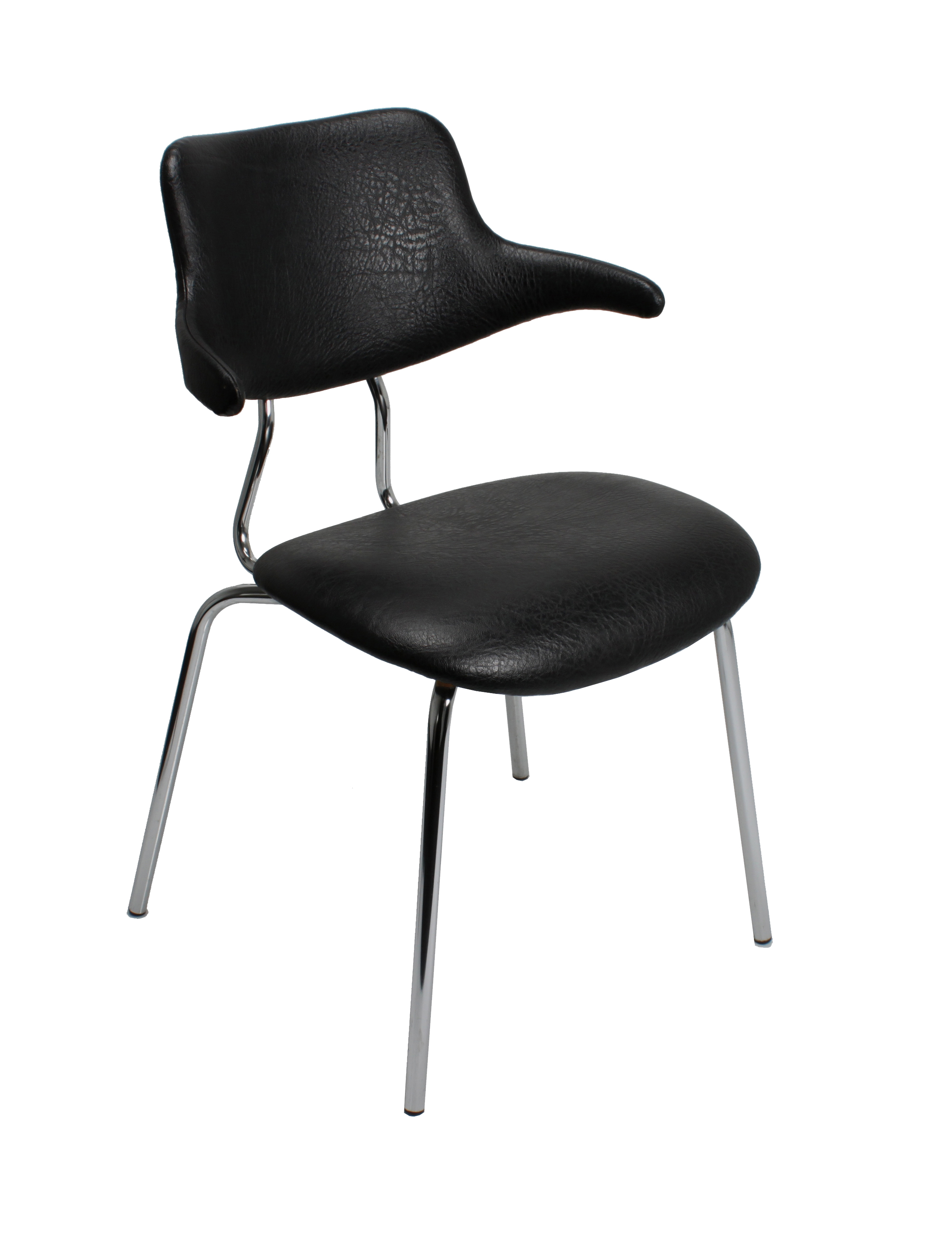
Chair VL118 designed by Vermund Larsen in 1964.

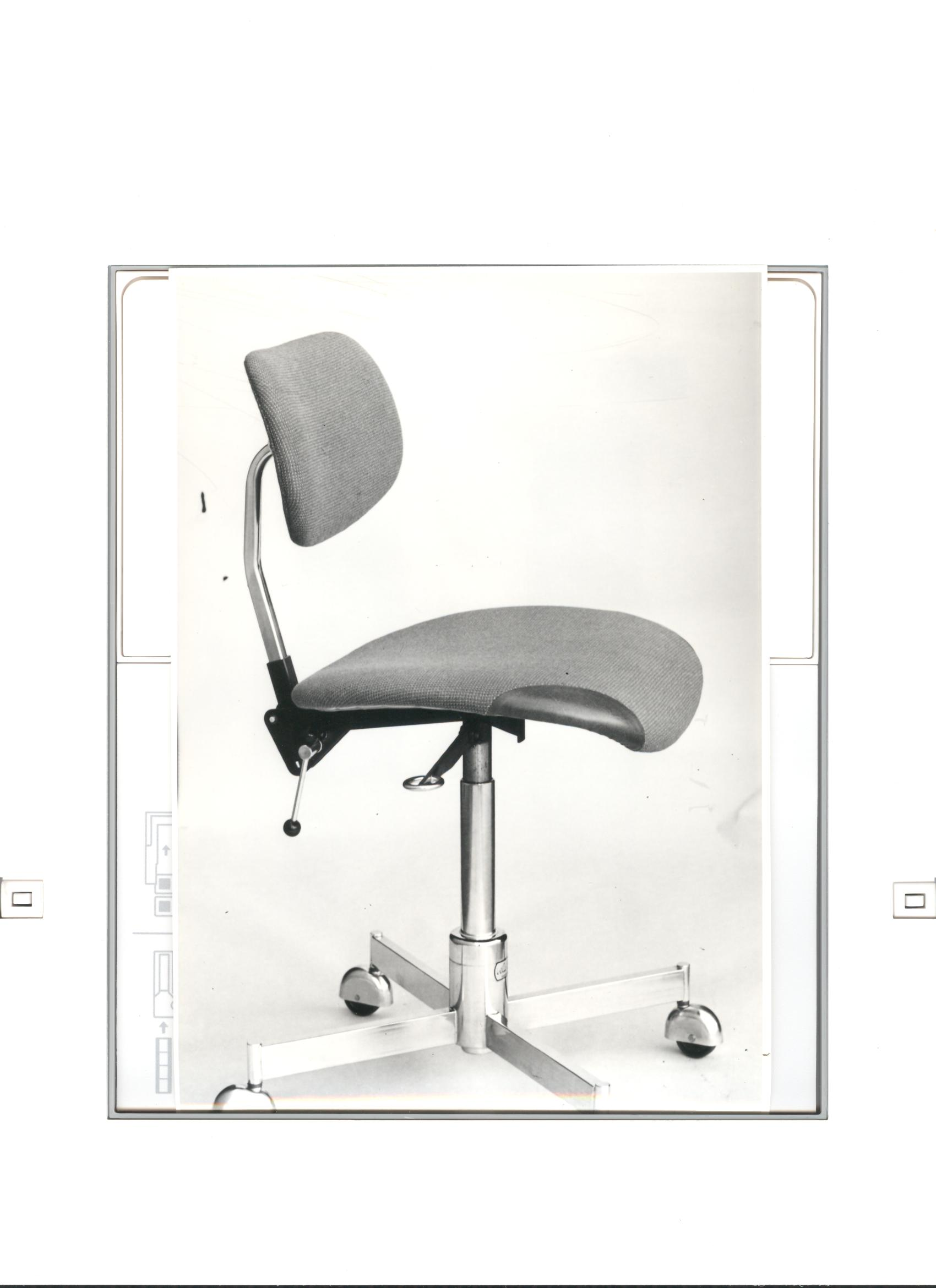
Chair VL66 designed by Vermund Larsen in 1966.

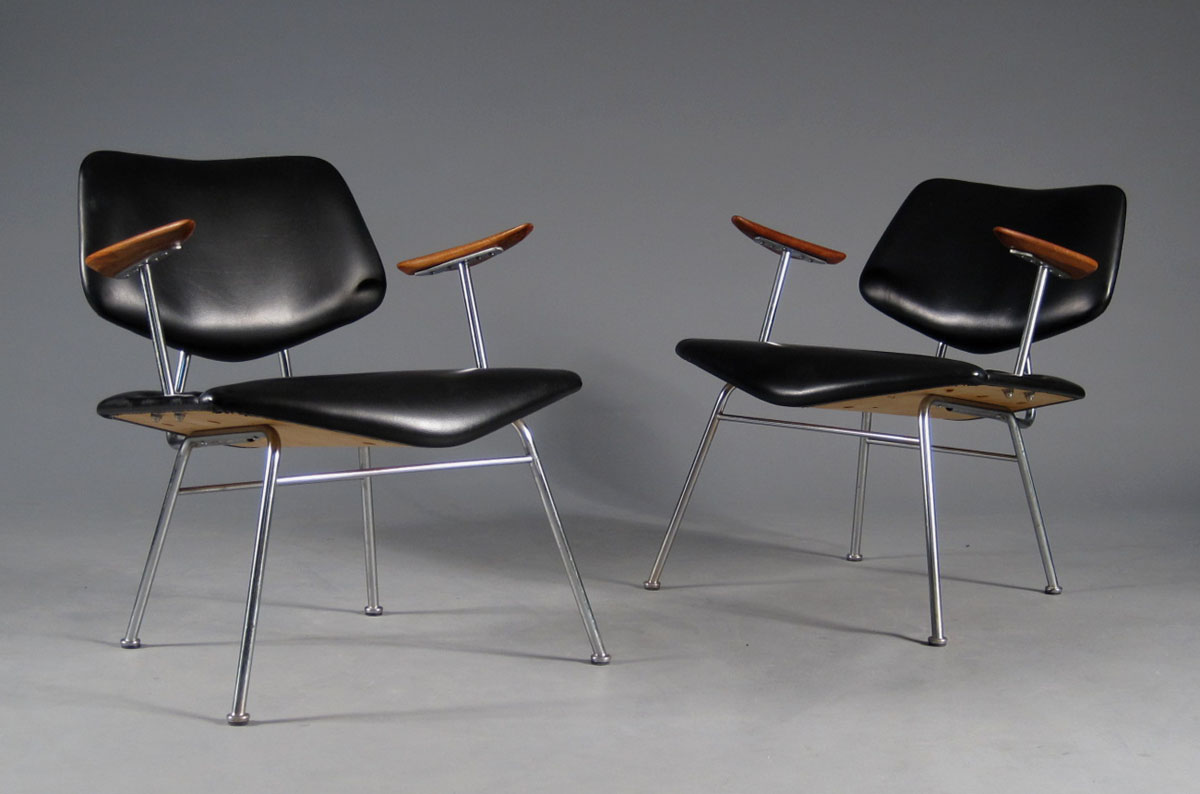
Cosy Chair 135 designed by Vermund Larsen in the 1960s.

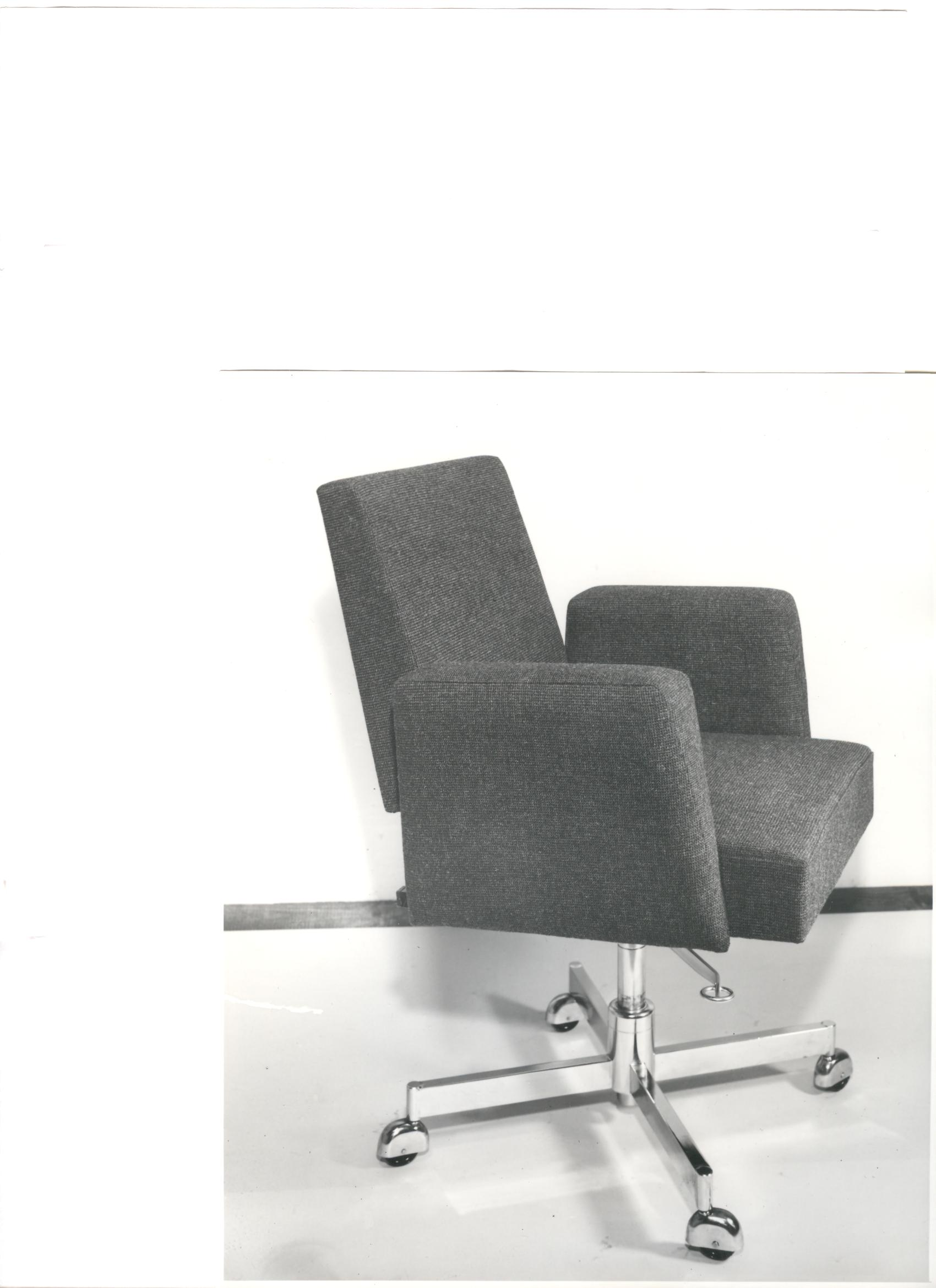
Chef chair - sketched and produced by Vermund Larsen.

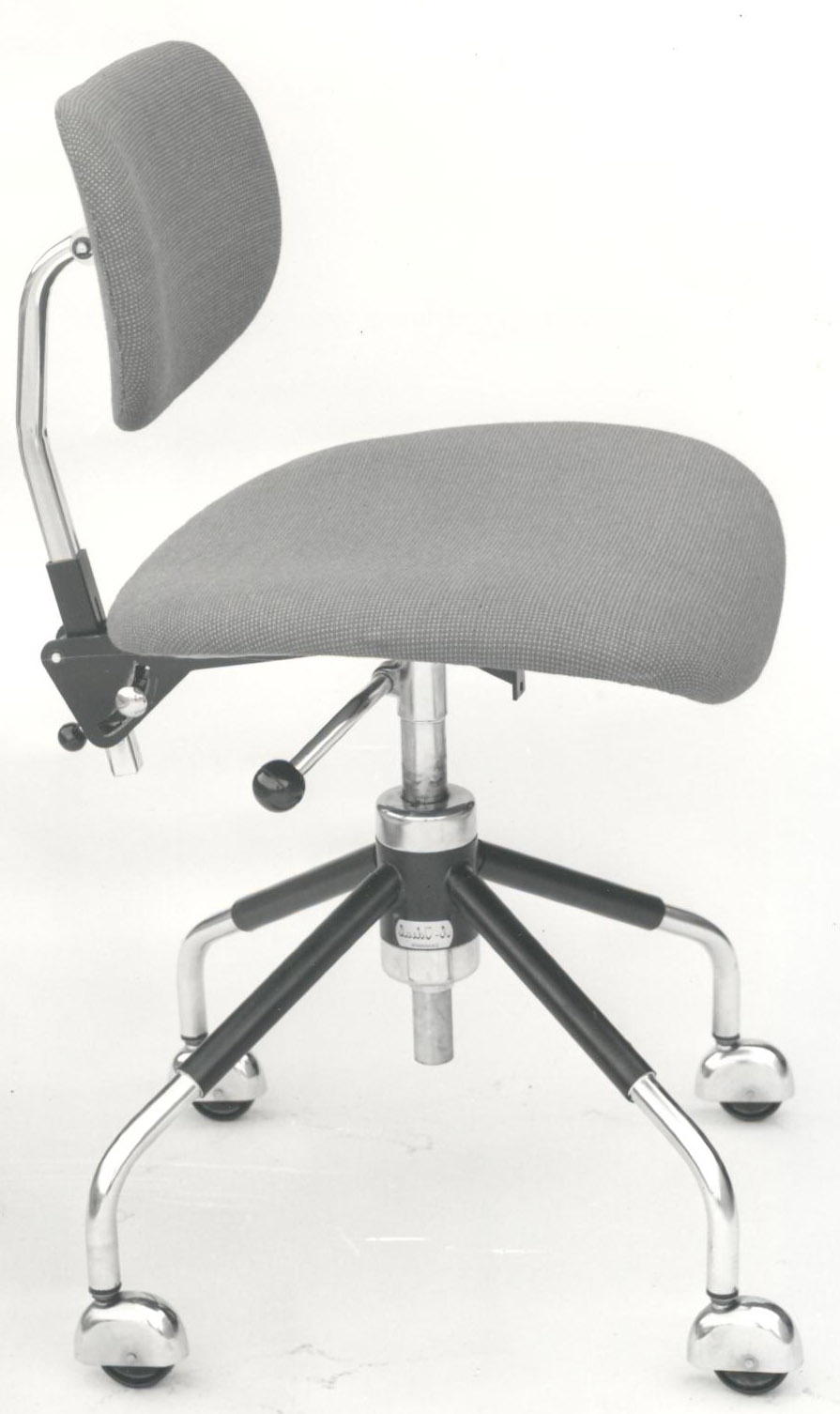
Ideal A - sketched and produced by Vermund Larsen.

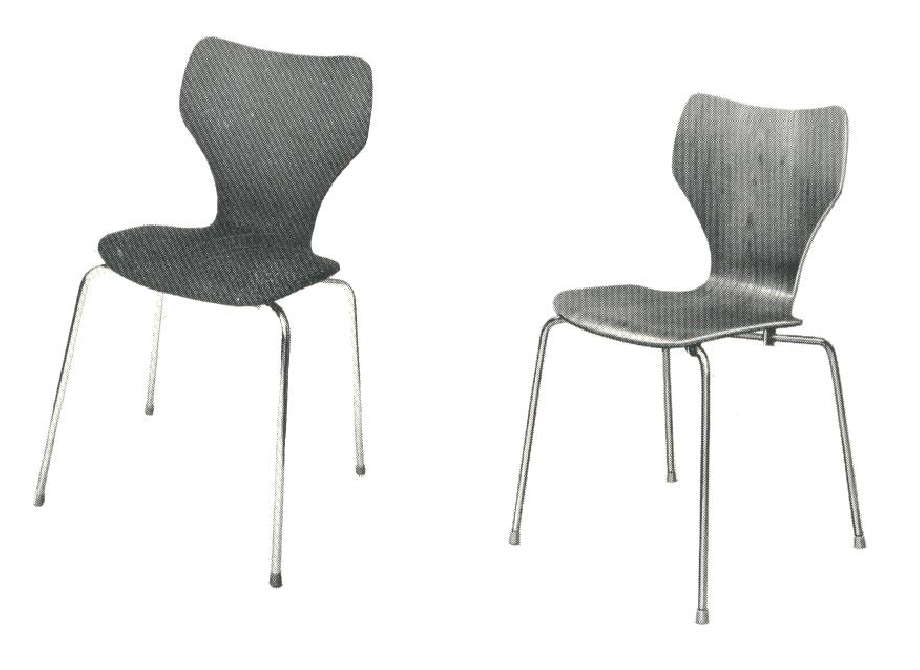
sketched and produced by Vermund Larsen.

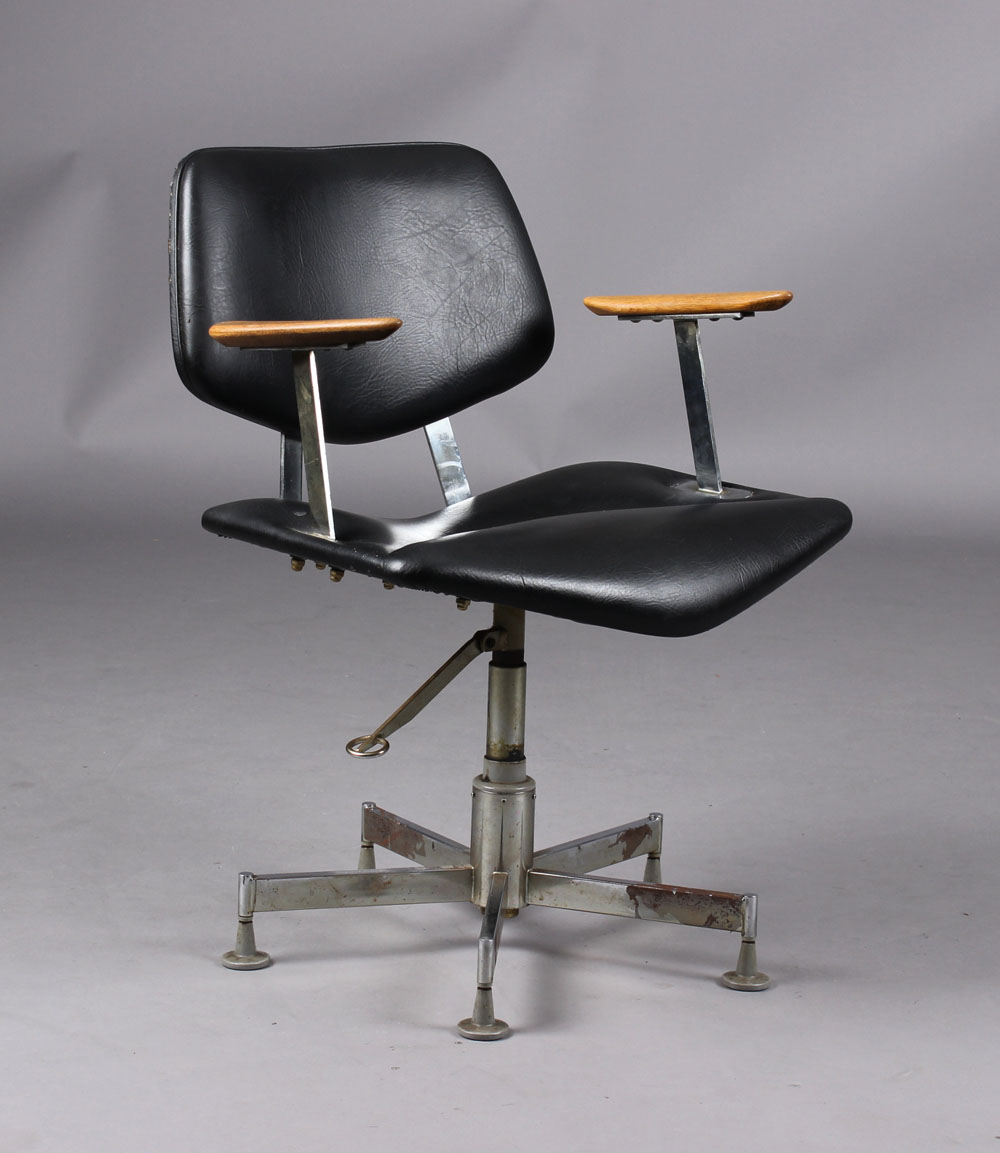
Cosy chair - sketched and produced by Vermund Larsen.
