= Elna Panduro =

Danish actress and operetta singer

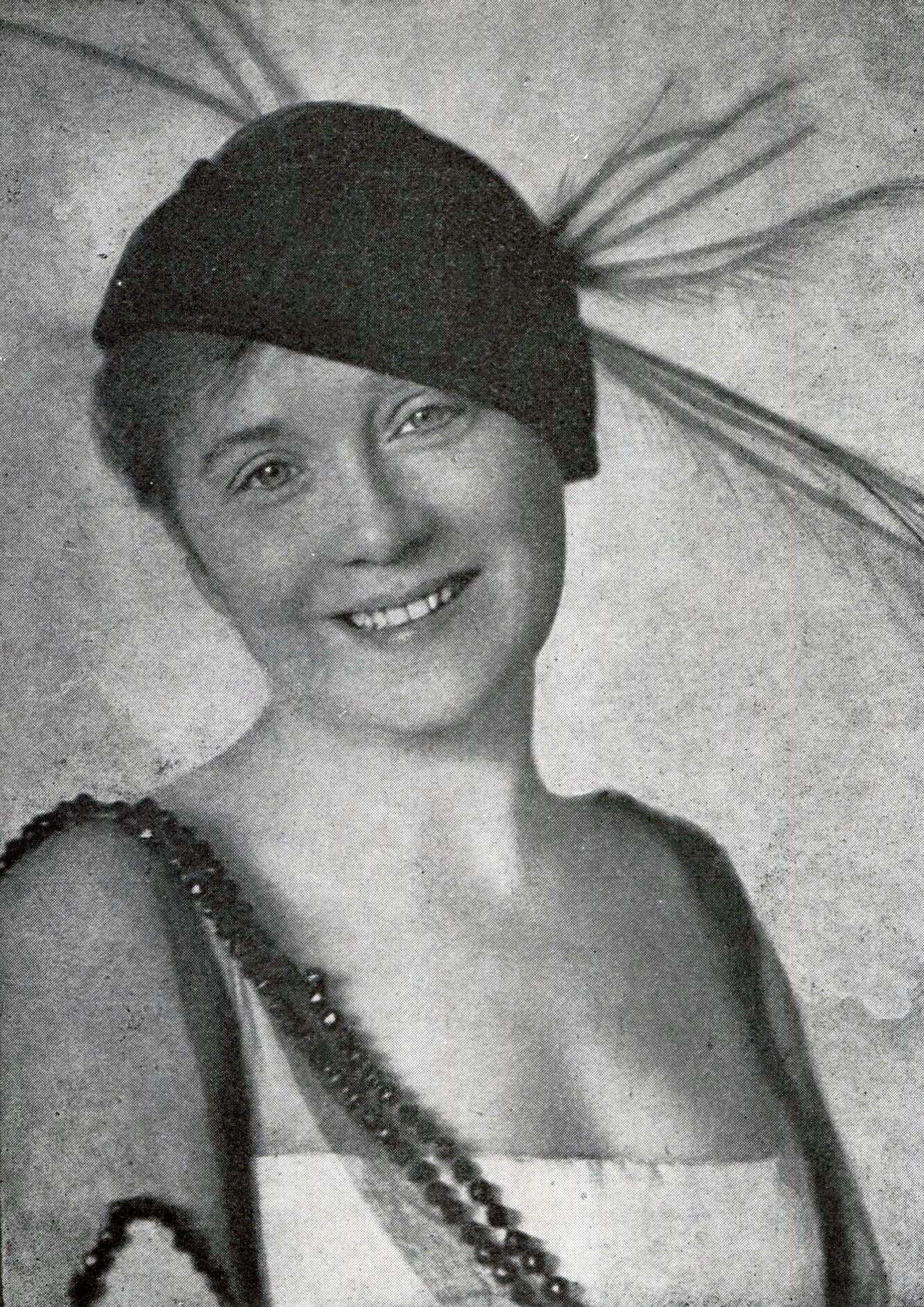
- Panduro in 1920

Background information
- Birth name: Elna Mary Eskesen
- Born: 11 May 1882; Copenhagen, Denmark
- Died: 6 April 1983 (aged 100); Copenhagen, Denmark
- Genres: Operetta
- Instrument: Vocals

Elna Mary Panduro born Eskesen (11 May 1882 – 6 April 1983) was a Danish actress and operetta singer. She appeared in operettas, revues and the silent film Hjertedoktoren. In 1914 she moved to Sweden where she toured with her own drama company, later settling in Stockholm. In 1936, she retired from the stage and returned to Denmark where she ran a restaurant. When she died in April 1983, she was almost 101 years old.

== Biography ==
Born in Copenhagen on 11 May 1882, Elna Mary Eskesen to parents Mads Christian Eskesen and Marie Sophie Jüliette Ekesen (née Lønberg). She married twice, first with the parliamentary stenographer Holger Isidoro Panduro and later the Swedish composer Gösta Hultgren.

Originally trained as a journalist, she decided to become a singer. After training for four years, she made her début in 1910 in Fredericia performing the title role in The Dollar Princess. A year later she appeared in a revue at Nørrebros Theater in Copenhagen where she gained increasing popularity, both in operettas and revues. One of her greatest successes was in the duet "Kærlighed er en løjerlig gråspurv" (Love is a ridiculous sparrow), which she sang with Holger Pedersen. In 1914, she moved to Malmö, Sweden, creating her own drama group in 1917. After touring the country, she settled in Stockholm where she enjoyed a brilliant career until the mid-1930s. She also performed in England and Germany.

On returning to Denmark in 1936, she became a successful restaurateur, running the Bellman-Källeren in central Copenhagen until her retirement in 1948.

Elna Panduro died in Copenhagen on 6 April 1983, at age 100.
