= Karen Callisen =

Danish geologist

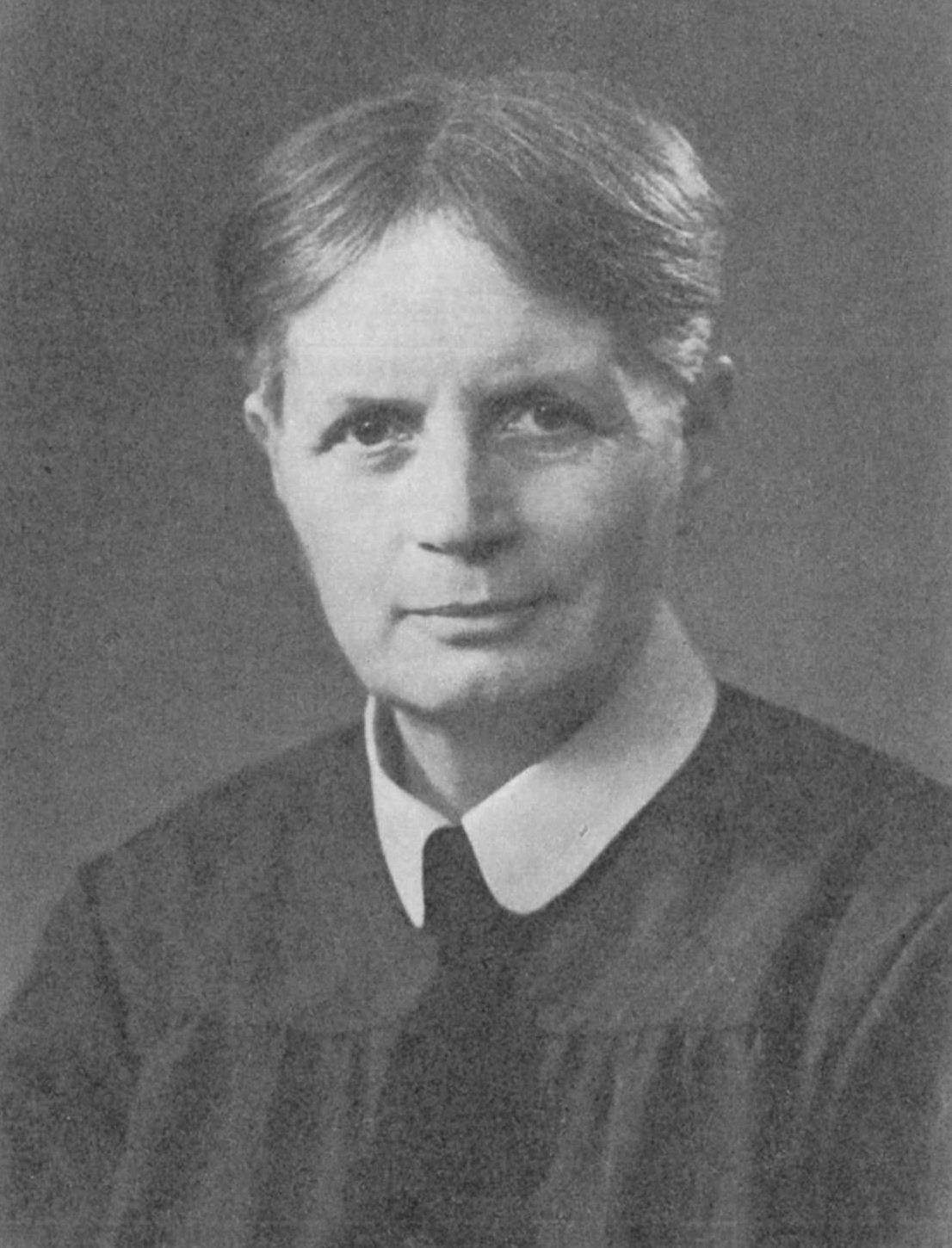
Karen Callisen (c. 1930)

Karen Herdis Callisen (5 April 1882 – 17 January 1970) was the first woman in Denmark to become a geologist graduate after studying mineralogy and crystallography in 1915. She was employed for the remainder of her career by the University of Copenhagen's Mineralogical Museum, holding the post of curator (museum inspektor) from 1932 until she retired in 1952. She made significant contributions to the geology of Bornholm, specializing in the island's granite. She also devoted particular attention to the composition of meteorites. In addition to her interest in geology, Callisen taught gymnastics from 1921 to 1947 at Ingrid Jespersen's High School in central Copenhagen. She published her geological findings in numerous books and articles.

== Biography ==
Born on 5 April 1882 in Tønning Parish near Horsens, Karen Herdis Kallesen was the daughter of the estate owner Søren Jensen Kallesen (1847–1930) and his wife Anna née Pedersen. After schooling in Horsens, she matriculated in 1901 after taking the Lang and Hjorts course in Copenhagen. She then studied engineering at the Politechnic, working in parallel as a stenographer in the parliament and as a schoolteacher in Hellerup.

As she became increasingly interested in geology, she transferred to the University of Copenhagen where she became the first woman to study geology, graduating in mineralogy and crystallography in 1915. While studying, she had already begun to work as an assistant at the university's mineralogical museum. She remained there on graduating, was promoted to amanuensis in 1919 and from 1932 held the post of curator. From 1921 to 1947, she also taught at Ingrid Jespersen's School.

Callisen showed particular interest in the granite on the island of Bornholm, presenting her Beiträge zur Kenntnis des Granitgrundgebirges von Bornholm in connection with her graduation. The authoritative work extends the workfindings of the minearalogist Niels Viggo Ussing. She subsequently undertook studies of the geology of Greenland and of meteorites which had landed in Denmark.

Karen Callisen died in Copenhagen on 17 January 1970.
