= Niels Hoegh Bronnum =

Danish missionary and physician

Niels Høegh Brønnum
- Born: 1882 January 5 Nørholm Sogn, Danmark (Denmark)
- Died: 1966; Roskile, Denmark
- Education: University of Edinburgh, Medical School
- Occupations: Pioneer Missionary, Physician, Evangelist
- Organization: Danish Branch of the Sudan United Mission

Niels Høegh Brønnum (January 5, 1882 – 1966) was a Danish missionary and physician who served in Northern Nigeria from 1913 to 1950. His achievements include translating the Gospel of Mark into the traditional Bacama language.

== Early life ==
=== Family life and friendships ===
Niels Høegh Brønnum was born in Nørholm Sogn, Denmark, in 1882 as one of twelve children. His father, Ferdinand Brønnum, was a school teacher who with his wife, Kirsten Christensen, raised Niels Brønnum and his siblings in an "old ecclesiastical home not devoted to any particular Church tendency." Brønnum converted to Christianity at a very young age and was confirmed on April 12, 1896. Brønnum's main involvement with faith was his association with the inner mission and small prayer groups. Though he was Christian, it was only when he was serving his turn in the Danish Militia at 23 years old that he felt a call to missionary life.

Brønnum became interested in missionary work through his elder brother of six years, Holger Rheders Fangel Brønnum. Holger Brønnum suffered from tuberculosis, which caused him to forego his life as a farm foreman in Germany. Holger Brønnum was good friends with Pastor Anton Pedersen, the founder and first president of the Danish Branch of the Sudan United Mission.

==== Pastor Anton Pedersen and Holger Brønnum's influence ====
Pastor Anton Pedersen was a Danish pastor who grew up in the country and was associated with the Holiness movement. At that time, it served as a background for the Danish Foreign Mission (also known as the Ydre Mission) and helped establish international and interconfessional contacts. In 1905, before the Danish mission was conceived, Pastor Pedersen was pastoring "Our Saviour's Church" in Aalborg. He was disturbed by the rise of Islam in Africa and preached about the need for mission work abroad. Brønnum befriended Pedersen when Holger was nearing his last days and despairing at the thought of being unable to join Pedersen on their vision of global missionary, reportedly saying, "Oh Lord, since I cannot go, send my brother, Niels."

After listening to his consumptive brother's pleas and reading letters by the Syrian Pastor Einar Prip of the New Testament, Brønnum decided he would pursue missionary work. One day when Holger asked Niels where he was going, Niels's response was "I am going to ask Pastor Pedersen whether he thinks I can be used a missionary." Pastor Pedersen sought to help Brønnum obtain the medical education he wanted. His small prayer along with a group of friends promised to help fund his education with the intention for him to eventually offer his services to the Danish Missionary Society (DMS) where he would supposedly work in China.

=== Medical training and affiliations ===
Brønnum attended medical school from 1905 to 1911 at the University of Edinburgh, a medical school in Scotland where other Danish missionaries also trained at the time. It was at Edinburgh that Brønnum met his fiancée and future wife, Miss Margaret Chapel Young, a Scottish fellow student "who had for many years felt called to be a missionary in Africa."

In 1907, while still in training, Brønnum attended a talk at the Tolbooth Church where Dr. Kumm presented the need for Christian workers in Africa. Also present in the crowd that day was Brønnum's friend, Pastor Pedersen. Both men were convinced that work needed to be done in Africa, but no mission societies in Denmark sent missionaries to Africa at that time.

Pedersen held a series of negotiations with pre-existing organizations to open a Danish mission in the Sudan. He began with the Danish Mission Society, reasoning that the new mission in Africa should be granted autonomy to direct and lead the mission. When he was denied, he went as far as Arabia in 1909 to negotiate with the Danish Church Mission to send Brønnum to Africa as the first Danish missionary. When this plan was also rejected, he continued campaigning throughout 1910 until he and Brønnum decided to get in touch with the Dr. Kumm in Britain, whose mission society was already in South Africa. In 1911, when Brønnum finished his medical training, S.U.M agreed to give the Danish group a field of its own with the caveat that the group form a society and agreed to operate as a branch of the larger organization. This field was to be in Nigeria and Jens Dixen, an American Danish farmer and school-master, agreed to field half of the charges needed to upstart the mission,

In October 1912, a conference was held at Swanwick where the work to be carried out by the Danish mission was endorsed as a distinct branch with autonomy on internal affairs, with the S.U.M being the designated middleman between the Nigerian authorities and the Danish mission. Their entrusted mission field was the Yola Province of North Eastern Nigeria and the mission was named Dansk Forenet Sudan Mission (Sudan United Mission, Danish Branch). The mission was rooted in Lutheranism.

== Personal life ==
Brønnum met his first wife Margaret when he was in medical school, and she first sailed with him to Nigeria. She died after giving birth to their son, Holger Brønnum, whom Niels Brønnum sent back to Europe while he continued his journey.

During his home leave his first and second term missionary tour, around 1915, Brønnum got engaged to Albertha Tholle, a Christian woman born in Denmark. Brønnum's engagement with Tholle stirred a lot of controversies.

== The Sudan United Mission ==
Brønnum served as one of the first missionaries of the Danish Branch of the Sudan United Mission (S.U.M). The Sudan United Mission was formed in the early 1900s in order to combat the growing influence of Islam in Africa (commonly referred to as the Sudan) at the time. The secretary general of S.U.M and its founder, Dr. Karl Kumm, received his doctoral degree in philosophy from Freiburg University. In 1904, he set out for Tripoli to study Hausa, the common language of West Africa. He continued his journey to East Africa and South Africa and developed a plan to set up Christian missions across the continent. His plans were successful, and the Sudan United Mission eventually spread beyond Africa and into Australia and New Zealand.

== Early missionary career ==
Map of Nigeria

A year before sailing to Numan, Brønnum and his partners studied the Hausa language in London. In 1913, Brønnum set out to travel with Margaret and three other missionaries – a nurse named Dogner Rose and a Mr. and Mrs. Farrant. In September they were to sail to Ibi in the Taraba state where the easternmost station of S.U.M was located. From there, they were to be joined by another missionary named Dr. Maxwell and travel via the Benue River to the Yola province where they were to find a place to build the Danish mission's first station.

In a letter dated May 26, 1913, Brønnum mentioned that his wife suffered from malaria and dysentery while on their journey but that she had recovered. In June 1913 as they were traveling, Mrs. Brønnum prematurely gave birth to a son and caught malaria again; she died shortly after. DBrønnum named the child, Holger, and after having him baptized, had Nurse Rose take the child back to Scotland. Brønnum continued to Ibi, the capital of the Muri Province, to observe how the British branch of S.U.M had set up their station. He stayed in Ibi and busied himself with medical work while awaiting Dr. Maxwell, who was delayed treating British missionaries. As British colonialism consumed a major part of Nigerian culture, Brønnum had to adhere to travel restrictions and regulations. In September, he set sail for Numan, one of the only towns in the Yola Province open to Europeans, where he would begin the work of setting up the station.

Upon arriving in Numan, Brønnum was told to continue to Yola town to gain permission for entry. While their boat was anchored, they were caught in heavy rainfall and the travelers were forced to transfer their belongings and themselves onto small canoes. After negotiating with the Resident of Yola, Brønnum was granted permission to temporarily stay in Numan where residency issues would delay him from beginning his missionary work.

=== Missionary tours ===
==== First term (1913 – 1915) ====
The majority of Brønnum's work was done in Numan, Nigeria. Upon arrival, he faced adversity with the British administrative power who "only regarded mission work in any positive way to the extent that is acted as a stabilizing factor in the society." He was frequently told to move locations, given restrictions on his interactions with the nearby Bachama town, and was denied permission to frequent other towns. Seeing as he paid respects to the chief of Numan as soon as he arrived, Brønnum had to rely on forming connections with village chiefs and connecting with the people through his medical skills.

While on board the Scarborough that was damaged in a flood on his way to Numan, one of Brønnum's assistants suffered a hip injury. The townsfolk were shocked at how well the young Nigerian was doing, as hip injuries of that degree often left the townsfolk crippled. The assistant's healing drew several of the sick towards Brønnum, and he worked with "different ailments, topical ulcers, infected eyes and broken bones".

Another example of his intermingling of evangelistic and medical work is in 1914 when the chief of a nearby village came to Brønnum seeking treatment. As Brønnum treated the chief he listened to recantations of the drought that had taken over Benue Valley. Brønnum urged them to pray and hosted a prayer session that night and the following day, and to everyone's surprise, it rained the following night. The news of this event spread throughout the neighboring villages, but also in Numan where the chief invited Brønnum to preach the gospel.

Preaching and introducing Lutheranism to the Adamawa people was facilitated by their pre-existing belief systems, which shared some similarities with Christian teachings, as the Bachama had a similar Lord figure whom they referred to as Homon Pwa. They believed Homon Pwa was the greatest of all demi-lords and his presence was to be everywhere and in everything.

After being ordained, Brønnum began more actively preaching to the Bachama people. Even though his travel ban was loosened, he still had to inform the colonial administrators every time he planned to leave Numan, and maintaining a diplomatic relationship with them was integral to him being able to do his work. He managed relationships with colonial authorities and maintained regular communication with the Board in Denmark, which at times faced internal disagreements.

During this time, Brønnum also began an initiative to teach young men Numan to read with the hopes that they would go on to spread the Gospel. As he built relationships with community members, he learned the Bachama language of the natives and completely translated the Gospel of Mark.

==== Working during the War (1914 – 1918) ====
World War I began in 1914, around the same time Brønnum began his missionary career. Because the British had colonies in Nigeria, the threat of the Germans was heavily felt in Nigeria. In Numan, there was an instance where Brønnum and other missionaries were forced to evacuate their materials into the nearby colony. One of Brønnum's good friends and employees, Mallam Farato, chose to stay in Numan with his boss instead of going to Shellam to seek cover with the other missionaries. Though the Germans never actually came to Numan, Brønnum requested for his body to never be buried in the Islamic style if he were to die.

==== Second term (1915 – 1917) ====
When Brønnum came back to Nigeria for his second term, he was not as alone. He had managed to maintain diplomatic relationships with the colonial administration by treating them in times of sickness, and he used these connections to request permission for teacher missionaries to help instruct the young Numan students who had been under his supervision. In 1915, a teacher named Mrs. Johnson became the first white woman granted permission to stay in Numan for the purpose of teaching. Thus, in 1915 the first Baptismal class was started in Numan. Several other teachers came to Numan including Miss Erichsen, Miss Tillisch, Miss Hansine Kristiansen, and Brønnum's future second wife, Alberta Tholle. As more missionaries like teachers and nurses had begun arriving under the Danish branch, Brønnum was able to organize a Missionaries' Conference in 1916 where he was elected chairman.

Notable accomplishments of the missionaries were the creation of the first church building and a medical center in Yola. Additionally, the missionaries founded a new school dedicated to educating missionaries. The missionaries had also begun talks of the foundation of a new church in Africa, with the guiding principle that "it must be natives who themselves should carry out the actual work of evangelism."

== Late missionary career ==
=== Return to missionary work (1919) ===
Though Brønnum broke away from the mission to prioritize his wife's health, in 1919 after she had recovered, he felt called to mission service again and offered to go to a new place of duty. Upon his arrival, he again showed a form of connection with the colonial authorities and natives, as he was able to influence the selection of a new king for the Bachama tribe. He leveraged these relationships to help found a Nigerian church. He also participated in the construction of a boarding school meant to train Nigerian Evangelists. He completed other projects including the founding of a boarding school for training Nigerian evangelists.

In 1922, Brønnum took over the new post of Secretary to the Danish Mission. Brønnum was given the new post of secretary when the mission was suffering financially, leading to increased difficulty in getting new missionaries out into the field. There were cuts in missionaries' stipends and reduced vacation days which led to enmity within the mission. Brønnum conducted his work in Denmark, but he often returned to Nigeria to solve complicated issues, such as the controversies that arose when experienced missionaries, Dagmar Rose and Peter Jensen, experimented with a new treatment for disease.

By 1930, the Danish Branch had become well-established amongst the other European missions. The mission at that time had forty missionaries on its staff and seven deputation secretaries, which was considered a lot given that their field population at the time was about four million.

==== Working during the Second War (1939 – 1945) ====
Brønnum was secretary general throughout World War II, which is the second great he would have worked through. It was a time when Brønnum was issuing certificates to grant European missionaries permission to enter Nigeria, and had to find ways to facilitate their journey as they could no longer pass through England. He was also accountable for the missionaries on the field, and in 1945, he secured a plane for nine of his missionaries to be taken from the field.

It was a relief to the mission members when the war ended. During a visit to the British Missionary Committee that Brønnum and his colleagues, Reverend Axel Pedersen and Reverend Tolgaard, were making in 1946 to discuss the extension of the mission in Nigeria, Brønnum thanked the British branch for all the help they and their subsidiary African congregations gave the Danish missionaries during the war.

=== Life as Secretary General ===
To a large extent, Brønnum abandoned his medical career in Nigeria. In one of the Executive Committee Agendas of the mission, he was listed along with Walter Miller and Andrew Stirrett as missionaries who "deserted medicine for evangelistic, administrative, and language work." After the death of Dr. Uhrenholt in 1919, the church went over 20 years without a permanent physician. As the Lutheran church in Yola expanded, Brønnum was involved in more clerical matters, like the ordination of the first five Numan pastors in 1948. From the period of 1951–1960, three new Bible schools were founded and the Church acquired a share in the Theological College of Northern Nigeria in Bukuru.

Brønnum was consulted for virtually all administration pertaining to the SUM, from dispatching new missionaries to the field to facilitating communication between British Executives and the Danish Council, which he was on. Executives often sent letters seeking Brønnum's approval for a course of action or for his notes on an event. Between 1952 and 1953, one executive wrote "Following on the comment from the Field Committee about getting in touch with Denmark it was agreed that I should send a copy to Brønnum and ask for comments from the Danish House Council on these suggestions" and another wrote, "Bristow has sent me the conditions that he attaches to our sending Karl Lundager to Gindiri...I told I told you that I have Brønnum's approval."

=== The Union Church (1955) ===
Later on in his missionary career, Brønnum was heavily involved in the idea of a Union Church, a new African church that would help unify the different branches across Africa. The Lutheran Church of Christ had already been strongly established in Numan and other parts of Northern Nigeria, but there was little coherence with the established churches of the other branches of the S.U.M. He strongly urged the missionaries on the field to find ways in which the Union Church would be possible.

"I do not think that the Danish Board has ever promised the other branches of the S.U.M to go in for a Union Church. My understanding is that the various branches have had the liberty to found the kind of church that they considered right, and when the time came, we should see and arrive at a modus vivendi by which these churches found way of co-operation that was agreeable to all and at the same time gave most reciprocal help.”

Another missionary, H.G. Farrant, stated that "...when Dr. Brønnum cast doubt on the acceptance to union he loosened the masonry of our foundation and the collapse which followed was frightening." Subsequently, several board members and missionaries on the field sought to bring about the creation of the Union church. During one of the Mission's conferences, the missionaries set the aim for the African church to have a "united authority without uniformity in practice" in which all branches would participate in the licensing of candidates for ordination, leaving the actual method for ordination to the local churches. Brønnum conveyed these ideas to the missionaries on the field. Brønnum created a draft of what the General Church Council would look like, in which he stated, "the General Church Council will be advisory [and] executive power will rest in the Region. The Church [will] therefore become a replica of the Mission." His draft was directly taken to the Executive in London where it was reviewed to be accepted.

Established in 1955, this unification of churches of all S.U.M branches in Nigeria became known as the Fellow of Churches of Christ in Nigeria. One of the new features of the Union Church was infant baptism and a new protocol that required church leaders to request permission when introducing new doctrines.

== Legacy ==
=== Writings ===
One of Brønnum's more famous contributions is his translation of the Gospel of Mark which was published in 1915. Other writings of Brønnum's include:

- Lemefeme da Yesu Kristo. Markus
- Iguda : en Fortaeling fra Afrika (Iguda: a Tale from Africa)
- Undervejs i Afrika (On the way to Africa)
- En nødstedt verdensdel : kaldet fra Adamwa (A distressed part of the world : called from Adamawa)
- Saeden spirer (The seed sprouts)
- Skjulte Kraefter : En Roman fra det indre Afrika
- Evangeliet i Negerland : kort Oversigt over den danske Sudanmissions Arbejde (The Gospel in Negerland : short overview of the work of the Danish Sudan mission)
- Negerracen; dens Histoire og Fremtidsmuligheder (The Negro race; its History and Future Prospects)

=== Awards and honors ===
Brønnum's mission found several ways to honor his contributions to their work. During the celebration Golden Jubilee of Sudan's Lutheran Church of Christ in Numan, Brønnum was given the title of "the founder of the mission" and given a special seat of honor with his wife. The festivities lasted three days and began with a re-enactment of Brønnum's arrival at the Numan landing of the Benue River.

In 1950, Brønnum received Danish Knighthood for 37 years of service to the mission. He received the knighthood of Dannebrog. Additionally, in 1961, the church in Nigeria commissioned two Nigerian pastors and a member of the Federal House of Representatives to bestow on Brønnum the feather cap of honor which stands as one of the highest honors the Bachama tribe give to men "who have greatly distinguished themselves." In 1964, the first secondary school in Jimeta, Yola was named after Brønnum who was known as the first Danish missionary.

=== Christian curriculum ===
Some of the teaching guides that taught about Brønnum include:

"Let Children open their atlases to the map of Europe and ask them to point to the country of Denmark. Tell them that the people living in this country are called Danish people. Three people, a doctor and his wife who was also a doctor, and a nurse, offered to come to the Benue alley where they had heard there was much sickness."

"...The chief [of the neighboring village] was not well, and he had heard how other people had got treatment and medicine from this doctor and how it had helped them greatly...during the visit the chief and the doctor talked about the bad drought...[after the chief left and it rained] these followers became the first members of the Danish Lutheran Church in Nigeria...Let the children act out this scene."

At the end of the lesson, the students would be asked "How did Dr. Bronnum show the love of Christ to the people of Bachama?"
