= Vilhelm Rosenstand =

Danish painter & illustrator (1838–1915)

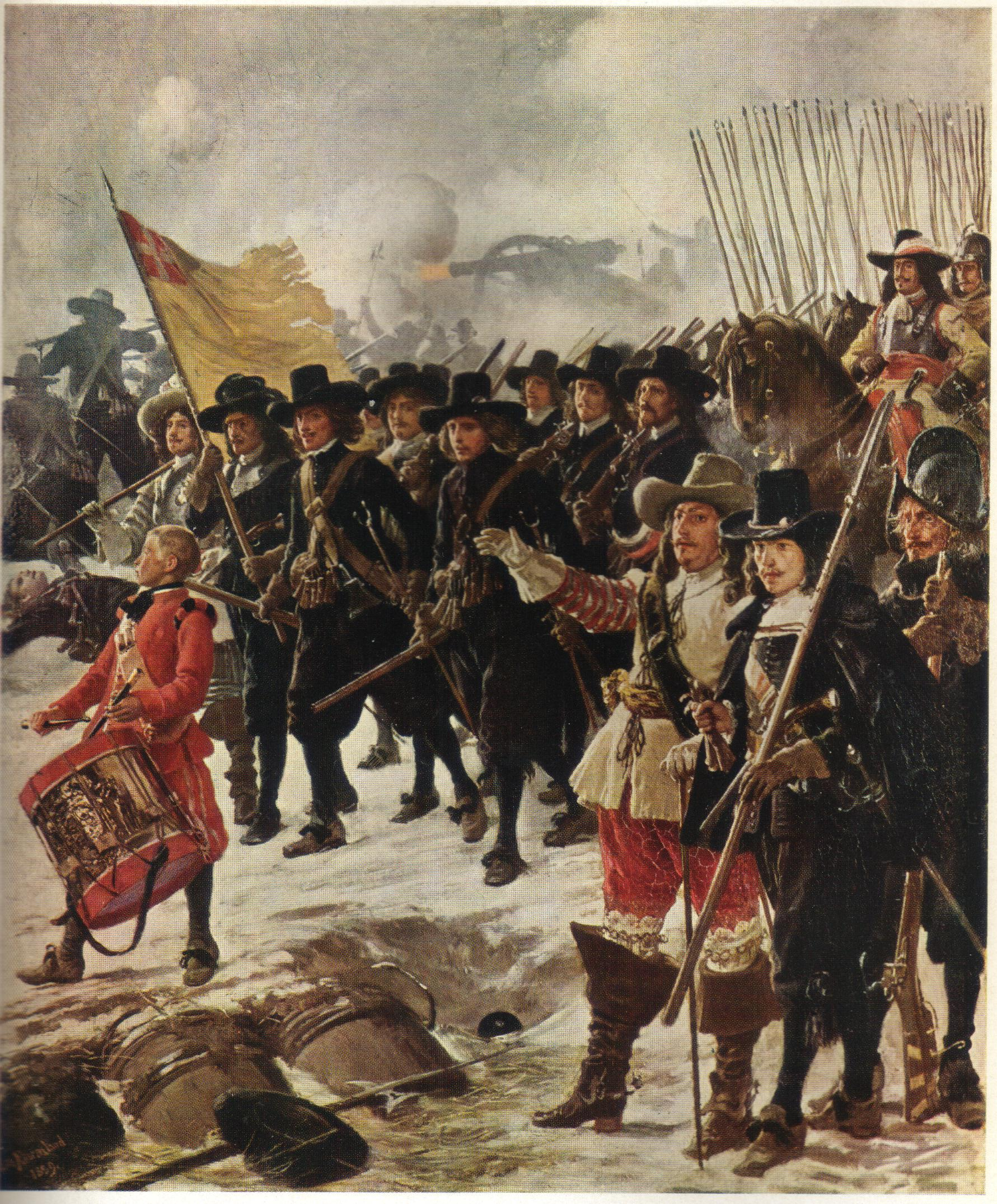
Vilhelm Rosenstand: Students participating in the defence of Copenhagen on the night between 10 and 11 February 1659 (1889)

Vilhelm Jacob Rosenstand (31 July 1838 – 11 March 1915) was a Danish painter and illustrator. His best known work is a mural decorating the banqueting hall in the University of Copenhagen.

== Biography ==
Born in Copenhagen, Rosenstand attended the Royal Danish Academy of Fine Arts from 1858 and took private lessons from his teacher Wilhelm Marstrand. He also studied at Léon Bonnat's school in Paris (1881–82). He first exhibited at Charlottenborg in 1861 with Genrebillede fra Vendsyssel before serving as a lieutenant in the Second Schleswig War in 1864. His war experiences are reflected in works such as Fra Saxarmen ved Dannevirke. Morgen efter Bustrup-Fægtningen for which he was awarded the Neuhausen Prize (De Neuhausenske Præmier) in 1865.

In 1869, on a grant from the Academy, he travelled to Rome where he spent a number of years. At the 1873 World Exhibition in Vienna, he received an award for his En Campagnuol og hans Hustru. He completed a number of genre works in Italy including Ved Kirkedøren (At the Church Door, 1876), En Landsbyfrisør (A Village Hairdresser, 1878) and Forlegenhed (Embarrassment, 1880). From Rome, he moved to Paris in 1881 where he painted genre works depicting everyday scenes such as Udenfor et Brasserie i Paris. Moder og Søn ved Pousse-Caféen (Outside a Brasserie in Paris. Mother and Son at the Café Pousse, 1882) for which he was awarded the Thorvaldsen Medal. In 1883, he returned to Denmark only to find that Realism had become the dominant trend, rendering his genre and historicist approach rather outdated. Sometimes referred to as Marstrand's last student, he nevertheless succeeded in winning the competition for decorating Copenhagen University's banqueting hall with his mural depicting students defending the capital during the 1659 Swedish assault (1889–90), and in his work showing Ludvig Holberg directing a rehearsal of Erasmus Montanus (1892).

Rosenstand can be considered a typical Danish artist of the second half of the 19th century. He was less popular than Otto Bache and in his day he was ranked below Carl Bloch. He painted genre works from Denmark and the south of Europe as well as portraits of artists, scenes from Danish literary history and from the history of Denmark up to the beginning of the 20th century. He was also a competent illustrator.

== Awards ==
In 1882, Vilhelm Rosenstand was awarded the Thorvaldsen Medal. He was elevated to a Knight of the Dannebrog in 1892.
