= Christianity in Nigeria =

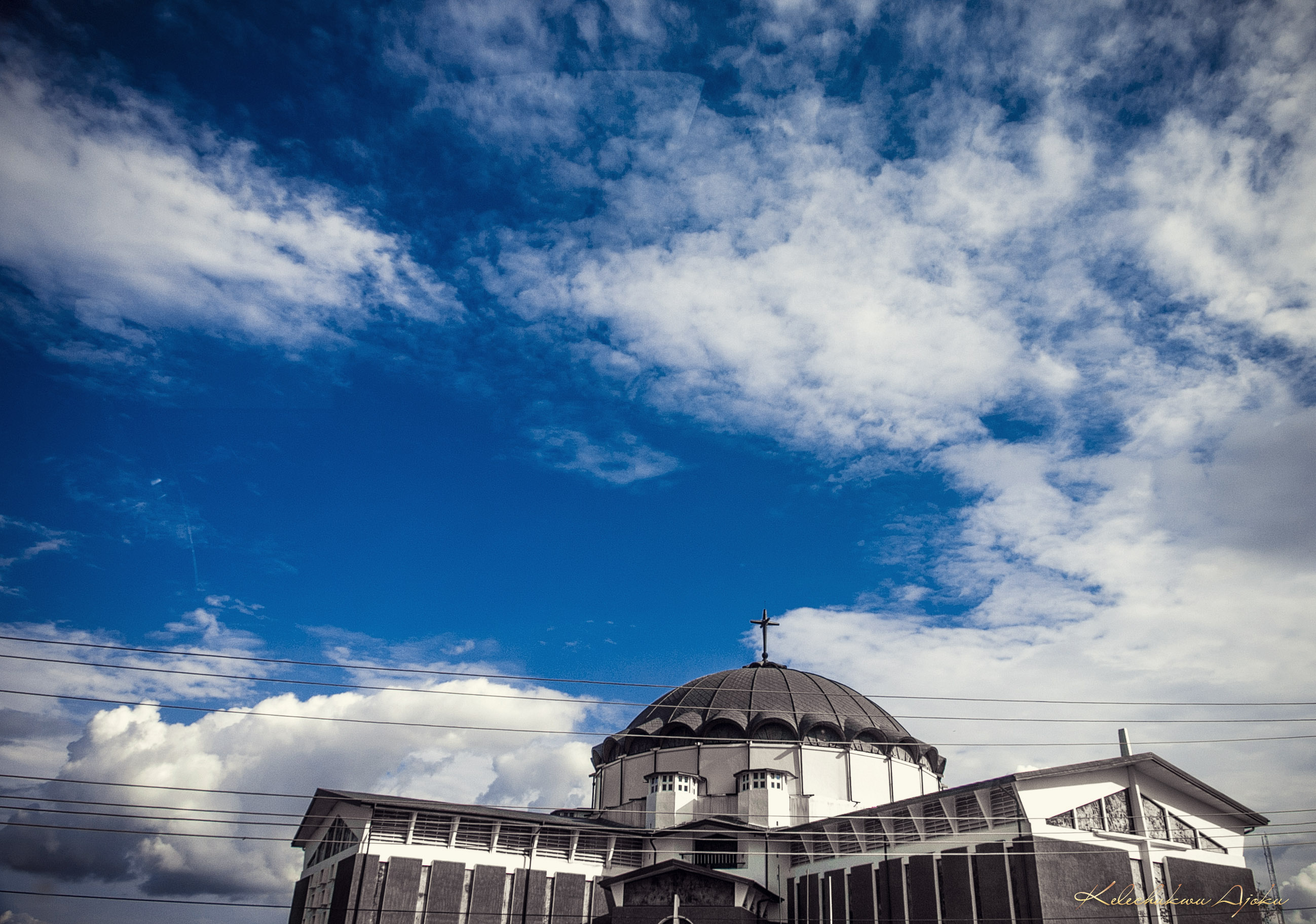
Assumpta Cathedral, a Catholic church in Owerri

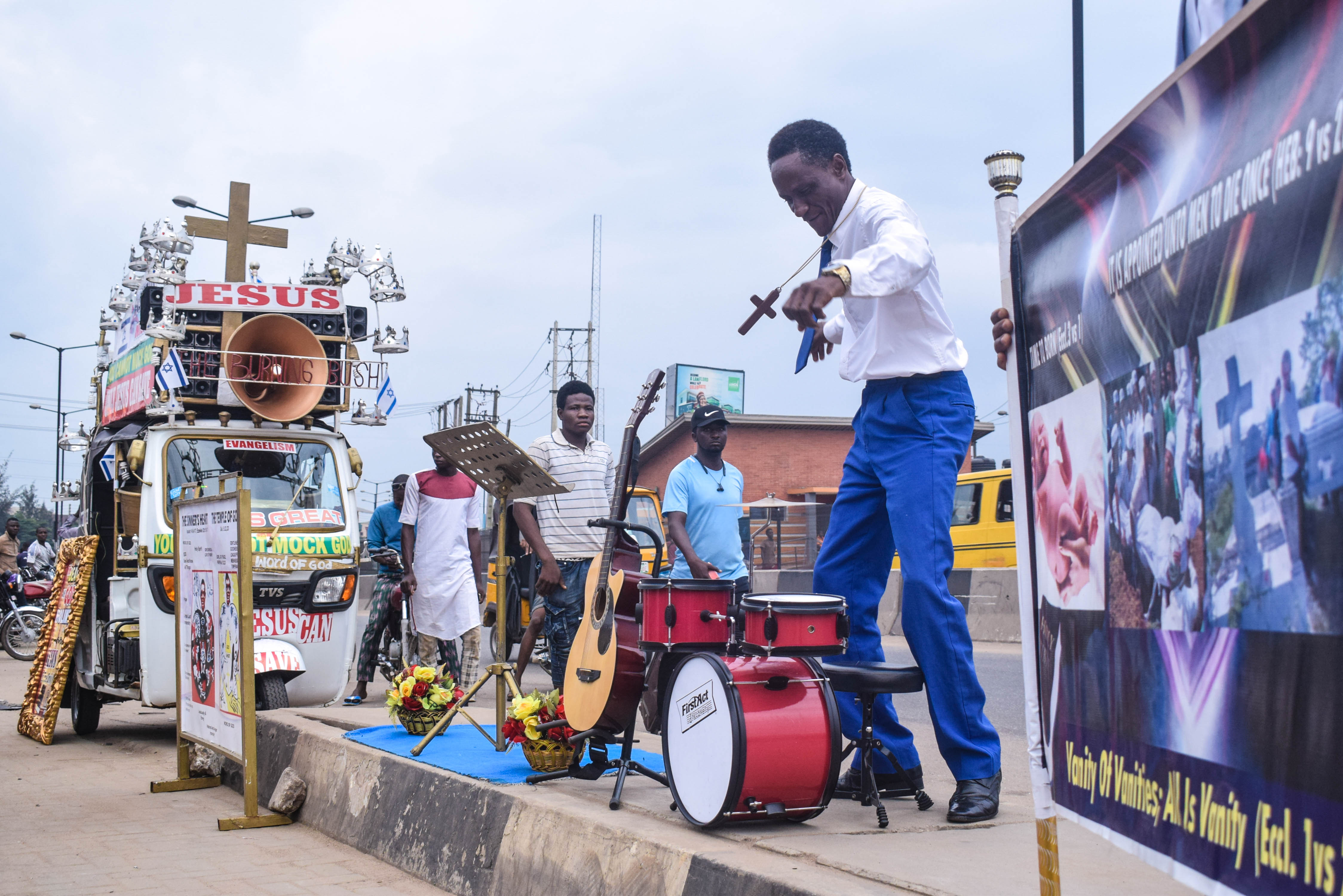
Street preacher

Christianity in Nigeria represents one of several religious traditions in the country, including Islam and Traditional African religions.

Christianity arrived to Nigeria in the 15th century through Augustinian and Capuchin friars from Portugal. By 2020, it accounted for an estimated 45% of the Nigerian population, two-thirds of which are Protestant. As such, it remains the second-largest religion in Nigeria, behind a 50–55% Muslim majority. According to the Pew Research Center, in 2011, Nigeria had the largest Christian population of any country in Africa, with more than 80 million people in Nigeria belonging to various denominations. Christianity is the majority religion in the southern and central regions of Nigeria. The 2024-2025 Afrobarometer found that the majority of Nigerian Christians were mostly non-denominational.

== Denominations ==
The 1963 Nigerian census, the last that asked about religion, found that about 47.2% of the population was Muslim, 34.3% Christian, and 18.5% other.

Figures in the 2020 edition of The World Christian Encyclopedia (Johnson and Zurlo 2020) drew on figures assembled and updated as part of the World Christian Database (WCD); these put those who identify as Christians on 46.3%, and Muslims on 46.2 and ‘ethnic religions’ on 7.2%. Statisticians estimate that there may be up to a hundred million Christians in Nigeria. In 2020, 51% of Nigerian Christians were Pentecostal, Charismatic and Evangelical.

=== Statistics ===
Major Denominations	Members (millions)
Catholic	21
Anglican	22
Church of Christ	8
Baptist	14
Evangelical Church	6
Redeemed Christian	5
Apostolic Church	4.5
Presbyterian	4
Assemblies of God	3.6
Lutheran	2.2
Methodist	2
QIC United Evangelical	2
Evangelical Reformed	1.5

=== Catholic Church ===
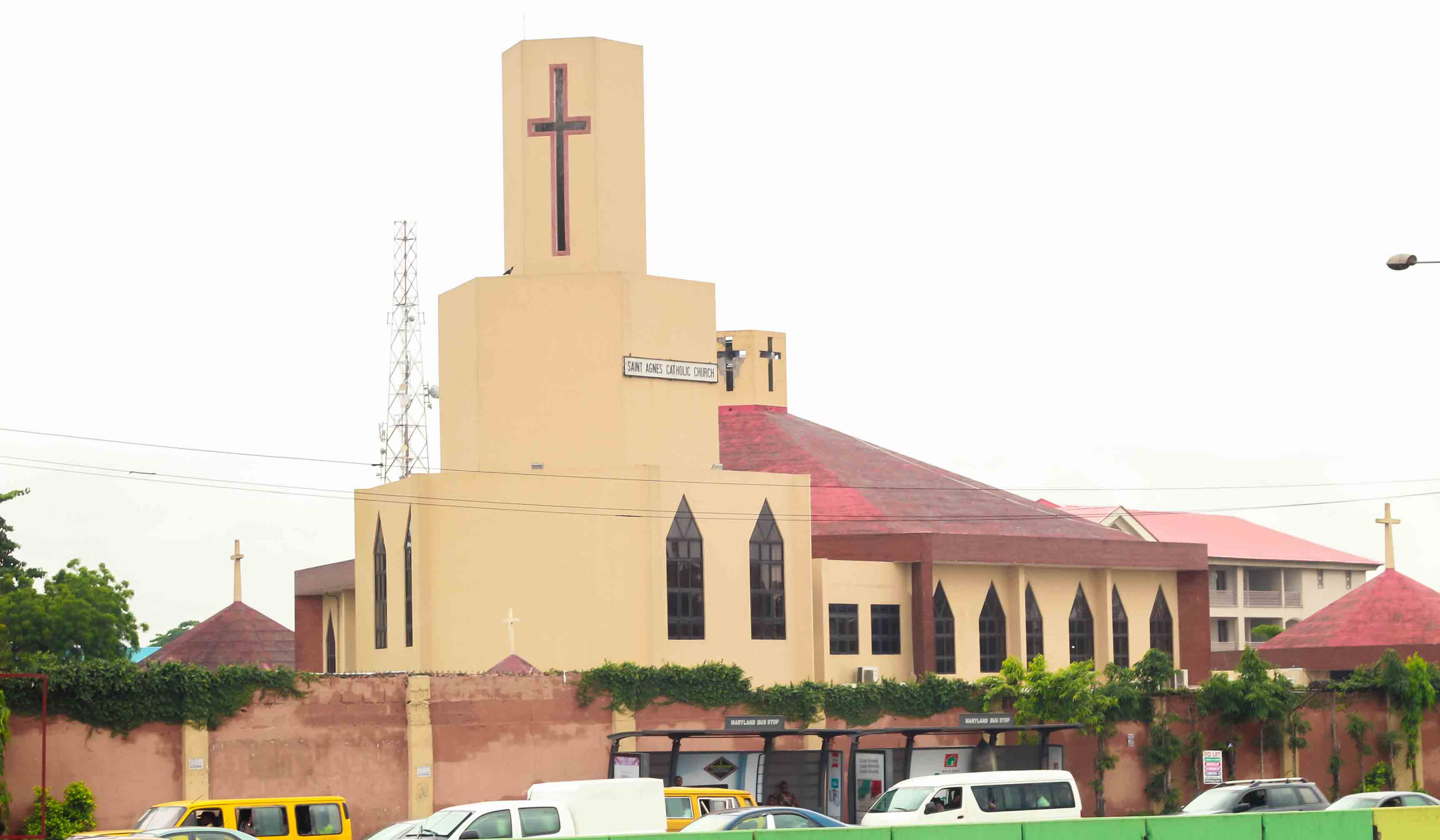
Saint Agnes Catholic church in Maryland, Lagos

The Catholic Church has seen an increase of followers in Nigeria. In 2020, there were an estimated 32 million baptised Catholics in Nigeria. The archdioceses of the Catholic Church in Nigeria are Abuja, Benin City, Calabar, Ibadan, Jos, Kaduna, Lagos, Onitsha, and Owerri. Cardinal Francis Arinze is a Catholic cardinal from Nigeria.

=== Protestanism ===
The ecclesiastical provinces of the Church of Nigeria are Aba, Abuja, Bendel, Enugu, Ibadan, Jos, Kaduna, Kwara, Lagos, Lokoja, The Niger, Niger Delta, Ondo and Owerri. Its primate, since 2020, is Henry Ndukuba. The Church of Nigeria claimed about 18 million members in 2016, with an estimated 2 million members being active.

The Nigerian Baptist Convention had about 6.5 million baptized members in 2008. The Baptist Mission was started by Thomas Jefferson Bowen in 1850. It currently has thirty five conferences in different ecclesiastical in Nigeria. It has its headquarter in Dugbe, Ibadan, Oyo State.

The Presbyterian Church of Nigeria has almost 4 million members in thousands of congregations mainly in Nigeria, but has regional Presbytery in Togo as well as in Benin. It was founded in the mid-1800s, by ministers of the Church of Scotland. It is a member of the World Communion of Reformed Churches.

The Methodist Church Nigeria is one of the largest Methodist denominations in the world and one of the largest Christian churches in Nigeria, with around two million members in 2000 congregations. It has seen exponential growth since the turn of the millennium.

The Lutheran Church of Christ in Nigeria (LCCN) is a major Lutheran denomination in Nigeria, a member of the Lutheran World Federation (LWF). It was established as an independent church in 1913 from the Sudan United Mission, Danish Branch (SUMD), known today as Mission Afrika. The LCCN now has an estimated 2,200,000 members in over 2,400 congregations nationwide.

=== Evangelical and Reformed ===
The Church of Christ in Nations (COCIN), formerly Church of Christ in Nigeria, is a Christian denomination in Nigeria. It was founded in 1904. Its headquarters is in Jos, Plateau State. It used to have the name of Ekklesiyar Kristi A Nigeria. It is estimated to have over 8,000,000 members.

The Evangelical Church Winning All has about 6000 congregations and 6 million members. It was founded by SIM, a missions organization established in Nigeria in 1893.

The Evangelical Reformed Church of Christ was formed in Nasarawa State on 8 July 1916. The church has approximately 1.5 million members.

The QIC-United Evangelical Church (Founded as Qua Iboe Church) is a Christian denomination in Nigeria. It has existed since 1887.[1] It has more than 1,000 congregations and 2,000,000 members.

=== Pentecostal ===
The Apostolic Church Nigeria is a Pentecostal Christian denomination in Nigeria, affiliated with the Apostolic Church. Its headquarters is in Lagos. It had 4.5 million members in 2016.

The General Council of the Assemblies of God Nigeria has its origins in the Nigerian Church of Jesus Christ and a partnership with the Assemblies of God USA in 1934. The council was founded in 1964. It had 16,300 churches and 3.6 million members as of 2019.

The Redeemed Christian Church of God (RCCG) is a Pentecostal mega church and denomination founded in Lagos, Nigeria. The General overseer (most senior pastor) is Enoch Adeboye, ordained in 1981. In 2008, it had 14,000 churches and 5 million members in Nigeria.

=== The Seventh-day Adventist Church ===
The Seventh-day Adventist Church in Nigeria as of 2016 has close to 250,000 members throughout Nigeria divided into three different unions.

=== Church of Jesus Christ of Latter-day Saints ===
Within Nigeria, The Church of Jesus Christ of Latter-day Saints also has a growing presence. As of December 2025, the church claimed more than 200,000 members in the country and had established 880 congregations.

The church announced the creation of a new Owerri mission in Nigeria in 2016.

=== Other ===
In 1970, 87,000 Jehovah's Witnesses were present in Nigeria, which grew to more than 360,000 by 2014.

The New Apostolic Church in Nigeria reported 300,000 members in 2016.

Aladura is a classification of churches that abide by a Christian religious denomination or trend inspired by activities of progressive church elements, J.B. Sadare, D.O. Odubanjo, I.O. Sanya and others in 1918. The denomination has over 3 million adherents worldwide. The Aladura movement started at Ijebu-Ode, Nigeria in 1918. This movement later metamorphosed to Living Faith Church Worldwide (whose headquarters is the Faith Tabernacle) and to the Christ Apostolic Church. The Church of the Lord (Aladura) is an African Initiated Church founded by Josiah Olunowo Ositelu in 1925, and inaugurated in 1930 in Ogere Remo, Ogun State, Nigeria. Ositelu was born on 15 May 1900 at Ogere, ijebu-Remo, Ogun State in Nigeria.

Since the 1990s, there has been significant growth in many other churches, independently started in Africa by Africans, particularly the evangelical Protestant ones. These include the mostly charismatic and Pentecostal denominations such as Mountain of Fire and Miracles, Christ Embassy, Streams of Joy International, Celestial Church of Christ and Dominion City. These churches have further many millions of members and followers in Nigeria. Estimates of Pentecostals and Charismatics in the country reach up to 60 million.

== National Church of Nigeria ==
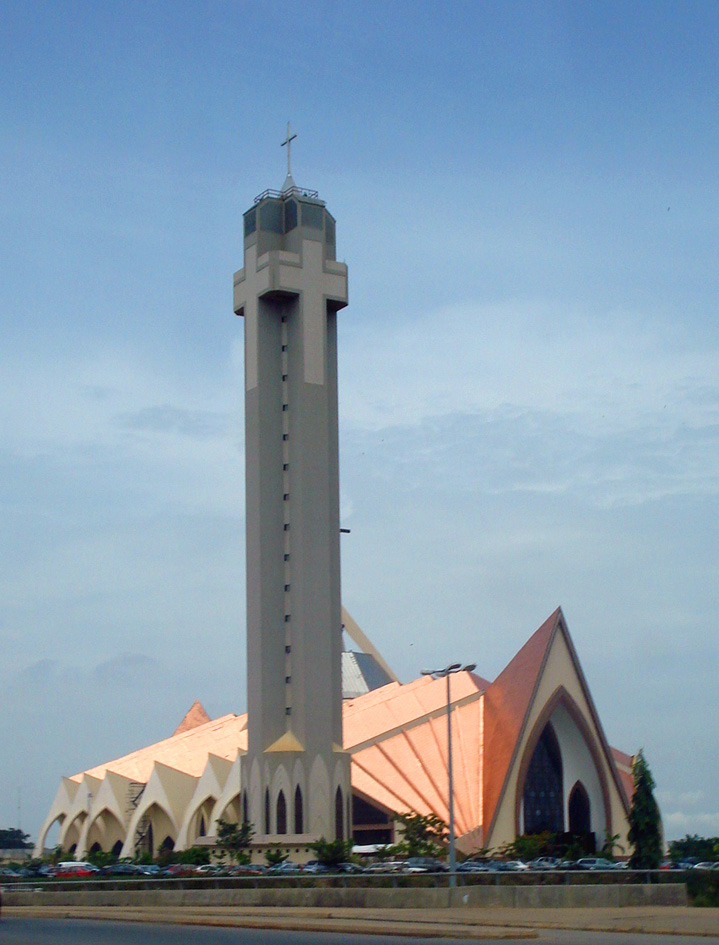
The National Church of Nigeria

The National Church of Nigeria (previously known as the Nigerian Ecumenical Centre and officially known as the National Christian Centre) is a non-denominational church building of the Christian Association of Nigeria, the umbrella body of many of Nigeria's Christian denominations. The church is located in Abuja.

== Freedom of religion ==
Nigeria was ranked sixth on Open Doors’ 2023 World Watch List, an annual ranking of the 50 countries where Christians face the most extreme persecution. In 2022, the country was ranked seventh.

=== Persecution ===
The ruins of a Catholic church in Akpanta, Nigeria, after being attacked by Fulani jihadists in 2025.

Multiple organizations such as International Committee on Nigeria (ICON) have called the killings a silent genocide. The Catholic Crisis Magazine has claimed that Christians are routinely denied land to build churches, that Christian students are denied Christian religious curricula in the primary and secondary levels, and instead are forced to study Islam and that they are denied jobs and promotions in government parastatals as well as the right to seek public office. According to The World Watch List for 2024, 3,100 Christians were killed and 2,830 Christians were kidnapped in Nigeria. In May 2025 a series of attacks carried out by Fulani herders killed up to 36 Christians.

In November 2025, US president Donald Trump threatened US military action in Nigeria over treatment of Christians.

In Nigeria, the Boko Haram insurgency aims to establish an Islamic state. University of Johannesburg law professor Werner Nicolaas Nel has noted that this has resulted in the persecution of Christians in Nigeria. There has been a tendency of "mischaracterisation of the situation as civil conflict". The number of Nigerian Christians killed for their identification as Christians accounts for 70% of Christians being killed for their faith worldwide. The academic Journal of African Studies and Sustainable Development published a paper in 2020 that noted that since 2015, over 12,000 Christians have been killed in Nigeria. Christian human rights organisations, such as Global Christian Relief have provided higher figures, such as documenting in 2023 that 52,250 Christians were murdered for their faith in the previous fourteen years. In 2025, this garnered international attention with United States president Donald Trump vowing military action in Nigeria if the attacks against Christians did not subside; on Christmas Day 2025, the United States targeted ISIS cells in Nigeria.

== See also ==
- Islam in Nigeria
- National Church of Nigeria
- Nigerian sectarian violence
- Catholic Church in Nigeria
- Protestantism in Nigeria
- List of notable pastors in Nigeria

Statewise

- Christianity in Adamawa State
- Christianity in Borno State
- Christianity in Kaduna State
- Christianity in Kano State
- Christianity in Ogun State
- Christianity in Osun State
