= Christianity in Sokoto State =

Christianity is a minority religion in the Nigerian State of sokoto, it constitute 10% of its population, where Sharia is partially practice (only muslims). The Roman Catholic Diocese of Sokoto has some 44,000 Catholics. The Redeemed Christian Church of God is active in Sokoto. An Anglican Diocese of Sokoto of the Church of Nigeria has been created in about 1990. An ECWA Samuel Matankari Memorial College of the Evangelical Church of West Africa exists in Sokoto. Zion World Prayer and Missions has its headquarters in Sokoto.

== See also ==
- Christianity in Kano State
- Christianity in Adamawa State
- Christianity in Borno State
- Christianity in Kaduna State
- Christianity in Niger State
- Christianity in Ogun State
- Christianity in Osun State
