= Christianity in Osun State =

Christians are a major part of the population in Osun State, Nigeria, and constitute 70% of its population. Bowen University of the Nigerian Baptist Convention and Joseph Ayo Babalola University of Christ Apostolic Church are present in the state. The Roman Catholic Diocese of Osogbo is present in the state as well. Osun Diocese of the Anglican Church of Nigeria has been founded in 1987 Ife Diocese in 1990 and Diocese of Oke-Osun in 1993. Osogbo has an All Saint’s Cathedral. Osun Baptist Conference of the Nigerian Baptist Convention claims to have more than 400 churches. The Evangelical Church of West Africa is present in Osogbo. Gunmen killed five people at a Cherubim and Seraphim church in Ile-Ife in 2011, which was related to the National Assembly election.

== See also ==
- Christianity in Kano State
- Christianity in Sokoto State
- Christianity in Borno State
- Christianity in Kaduna State
- Christianity in Niger State
- Christianity in Adamawa State
- Christianity in Ogun State
