= Christianity in Ogun State =

Christianity is a majority religion in Ogun State and it constitutes over 70% of its population. The Roman Catholic Diocese of Ijebu-Ode and the Roman Catholic Diocese of Abeokuta are present in the state. Ijebu-Ode has a St. Clare's Monastery. The international headquarters of the Church of the Lord (Aladura) are in Ogere-Remo, Ogun State. The Universal Church of the Kingdom of God is present in the state. In Ogun State, the Celestial Church of Christ has Alafia, Emi, Ibukun, Itunu, Itunu Iyanu, Iyanu, Oba Nla, Ogo Oluwa, and Oluwaseun Parishes. Christ Apostolic Church has churches in the state. Jubilee Christian Church International has its headquarters in Abeokuta. The Anglican church is present in Ogun State. The town of Ota has a tract of land known as Canaanland, which includes the church of the name Faith Tabernacle and Covenant University. Crawford University and Seventh-day Adventist Babcock University are present in the state. Western Diocese of Salem International Christian Centre has its seat in the state. The Redeemed Christian Church of God owns Redeemer's University. Christ International Divinity College (CINDICO) has its seat in the state.

== See also ==
- Christianity in Kano State
- Christianity in Sokoto State
- Christianity in Borno State
- Christianity in Kaduna State
- Christianity in Niger State
- Christianity in Adamawa State
- Christianity in Osun State
