= Christianity in Adamawa State =

Adamawa state is the home of a large number of Christians, forming the largest minority religion in the predominantly Muslim state. Christian communities in the state have been heavily attacked by Boko Haram. These attacks have been reduced due to the Nigerian military's activities against terrorism in the region.

== See also ==
- Christianity in Kano State
- Christianity in Sokoto State
- Christianity in Borno State
- Christianity in Kaduna State
- Christianity in Niger State
- Christianity in Ogun State
- Christianity in Osun State
