= New Kuchingoro IDP Camp =

Internally displaced persons camp in Nigeria

New Kuchingoro IDP Camp (also spelled New Kunchingoro) is an informal settlement for internally displaced persons (IDPs) located in the New Kuchingoro area, near Games Village, in the Abuja Municipal Area Council of the Federal Capital Territory, Nigeria. It is one of several IDP camps in Abuja, alongside camps at Lugbe, Area One (Durumi), Kuje, and Wassa. The camp mainly houses people displaced by the Boko Haram insurgency in Nigeria's North East, as well as some displaced by farmer–herder clashes in Kaduna and Nasarawa states.

== History ==
The camp came into existence in 2014, after residents of Borno State, Adamawa State, and neighbouring areas fled attacks by Boko Haram and sought refuge in Abuja. Many residents originate from Gwoza in Borno State, with others from Bogoro in Bauchi State and from Kaduna, Nasarawa and Plateau states. Unlike government-run camps, New Kuchingoro developed informally on privately owned land, without official recognition or planning.

== Demographics and conditions ==
Estimates of the camp's population have varied over time, with reports citing figures of around 1,200 residents in 2026 and about 1,550 in 2019. The majority of residents are women and children. Housing largely consists of makeshift shelters built from zinc sheeting, tarpaulin, and plastic sheeting.

Camp conditions have been repeatedly described by visiting organisations and journalists as poor, with inadequate sanitation, limited access to potable water, and overcrowding. A single borehole has served as the main water source for the camp, while sanitation facilities, including a shared pit latrine and bathroom provided by a non-governmental organisation, have been reported as insufficient for the population. Reporting has also described high rates of child malnutrition among camp residents.

Security within the camp has largely been provided informally by a Civilian Joint Task Force made up of IDPs themselves, rather than by state police, and journalists have reported concerns about exploitation, including a documented survival sex trade among some women in the camp.

== Education ==
Educational provision within the camp has relied heavily on volunteer teachers and support from non-governmental and faith-based organisations rather than the Nigerian state school system. A primary school within the camp has been reported serving over 100 pupils with limited resources and few professionally trained teachers. Other schools operating within the camp have included one supported by Africa Arise International, reported in 2024 to provide free education to around 320 children born in the camp, and the "Nos Vies En Partage" school, which has received hygiene and learning-material support from the Jesuit Refugee Service.

== Humanitarian and NGO support ==
Various government agencies and civil-society organisations have carried out interventions at the camp. In 2026, the National Commission for Refugees, Migrants and Internally Displaced Persons, together with partner organisations including the FCT Department of Public Health and the National Malaria Elimination Programme, conducted a medical outreach at the camp offering free health screening, malaria treatment, deworming, and health education. The camp has also received support from the Jesuit Refugee Service, DevTech Systems, and other groups providing educational materials, hygiene supplies, and livelihood training.

Despite such interventions, residents and researchers have described a persistent lack of durable government support. During the COVID-19 lockdown in 2020, camp representatives said that promised federal palliatives had not reached residents.

== Threat of eviction ==
Because the camp sits on privately owned land, its residents have faced repeated threats of eviction. The landowner first notified residents of plans to redevelop the land in 2019, and issued a further eviction notice in June 2020. In April 2024, the camp faced a demolition order from the Federal Capital Territory police, later reported to have been suspended following appeals to federal officials. A further partial demolition of the camp was reported in October 2024.

== See also ==
- List of internally displaced persons camps in Nigeria
- IDP camps in Nigeria
- Boko Haram insurgency
- Internally displaced person
