= Uriah Kolo =

Anglican bishop in Nigeria

Uriah Kolo is an Anglican bishop in Nigeria: he is the inaugural Bishop of Doko, one of 11 dioceses within the Anglican Province of Lokoja, itself one of 14 provinces within the Church of Nigeria.

The diocese was created in 2009. The proposals of the Provincial Standing Committee led by Bishop Jonah Kolo were accepted by Archbishop Peter Akinola and the Standing Committee of the Church of Nigeria. Uriah Kolo's election took place at Lokoja on 22 May 2009. He was consecrated on 12 July that year.
