= Church of Saint Joseph (Nancy) =

- Église Saint-Joseph
- Church of Saint Joseph
- 48.68320°N 6.17426°E
- Location: Nancy
- Country: France
- Denomination: Roman Catholic

History
- Status: Parish church
- Dedication: Saint Joseph

Architecture
- Functional status: active

The Church of Saint Joseph (French: Église Saint-Joseph de Nancy) is a Roman Catholic church in Nancy, France, on the Rue de Mon-Désert. It was built in Romanesque Revival style between 1890 and 1905. It is noted for its pipe organ, which dates to 1758, and is a monument historique.

== History ==
The Church of Saint Joseph is a Roman Catholic church on the Rue de Mon-Désert in Nancy, France. It was built in Romanesque Revival style between 1890 and 1905 as a parish church. It was designed by architect Léopold Amédée Hardy, with a pulpit and furniture designed by Eugène Vallin.

== Organ ==
Jean-Adam Dingler built the church's pipe organ in 1758 for the former Abbey of Saint-Joseph in Nancy, now a Protestant church. In addition to being relocated to the church, the pipe organ has since been heavily modified. The organ case and instrumental parts were classified as a monument historique by decrees dated September 10 and 22, 1990, respectively.
