= Internally displaced persons camps in Borno =

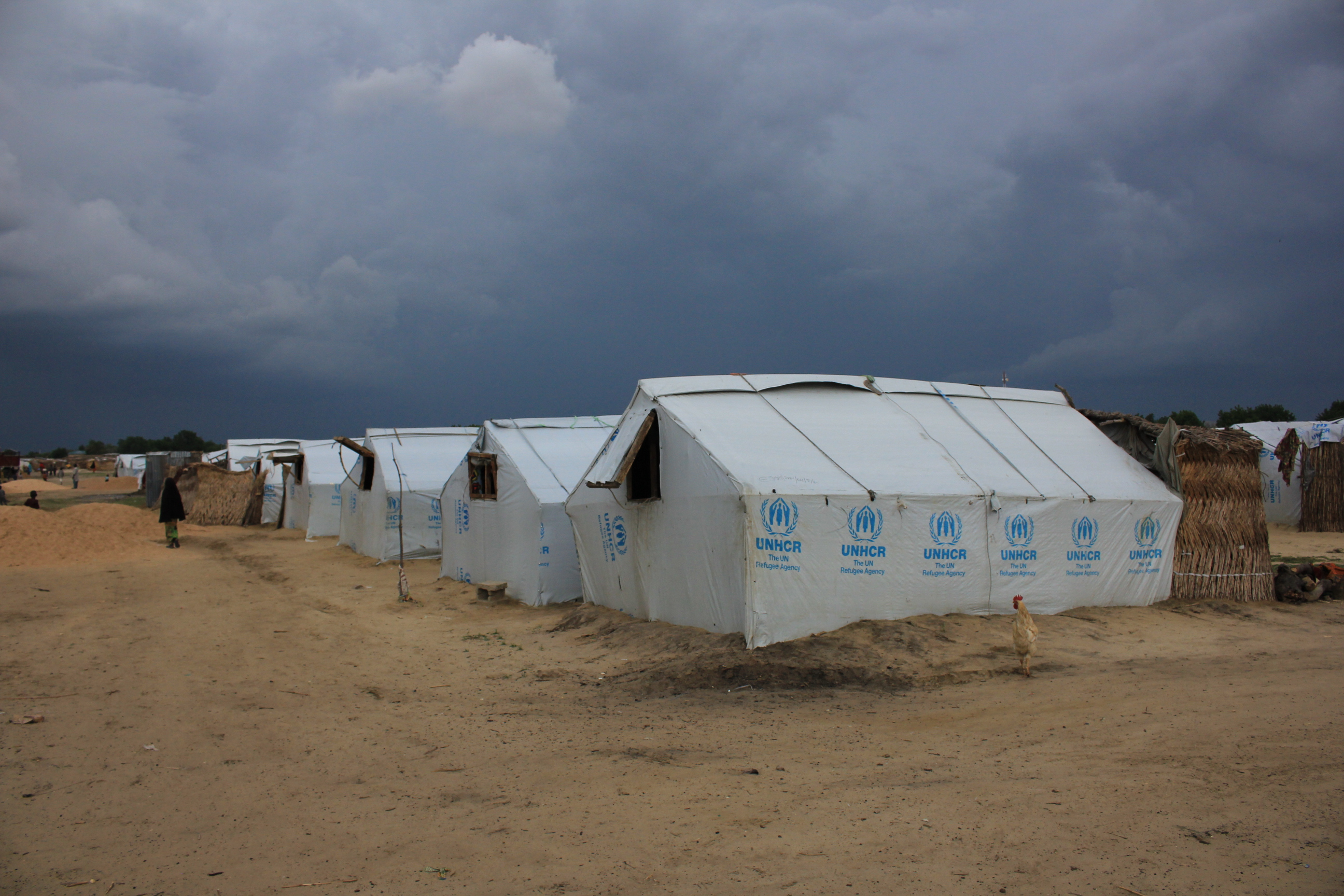
An IDP camp outside Maiduguri from 2018, where internally displaced people come to escape harassment from the Boko Haram insurgency.

Internally displaced person camps in Borno State, Nigeria were centers accommodating Nigerians who had been forced to flee their homes but remain within the country's borders. Displaced persons camps in Maiduguri accommodated from 120,000 to 130,000 people, while those in local government areas ranged above 400,000. There were over two million displaced persons in the state. Internal Displacement Monitoring Centre (IDMC) suggested the figure of internally displaced persons in the state to be 1,434,149, the highest in Northern Nigeria.

== 2016 ==
Millions of people became homeless as a result of the jihadist terrorist group Boko Haram's insurgency, which centres on Borno and began in 2009. Internally Displaced Persons (IDP) camps remained 32 in Borno, 16 of which were located in Maiduguri, while 16 were in local government areas.

== 2017 ==
Kashim Shettima, the state's governor, said in October 2016 that all IDP camps in the state would be closed down by 29 May 2017 because "it is becoming a problem on their own."

In January, the Air Force mistakenly bombed an IDP camp in Rann. In March, Boko Haram bombed an IDP camp in Maiduguri.

== 2024 ==
As of July 2024, 215 IDP camps plus 473 host-community sites are still active in Borno. The state government has closed or partially closed 17 camps, with a stated target of closing all official camps and said all official camps by 2027.

== Related Articles ==
Healthcare services in an African IDP Camps
