= Diocese of Maiduguri =

Diocese of Maiduguri may refer to:

- Anglican Diocese of Maiduguri
- Roman Catholic Diocese of Maiduguri
