= National Christian Centre =

- National Church of Nigeria
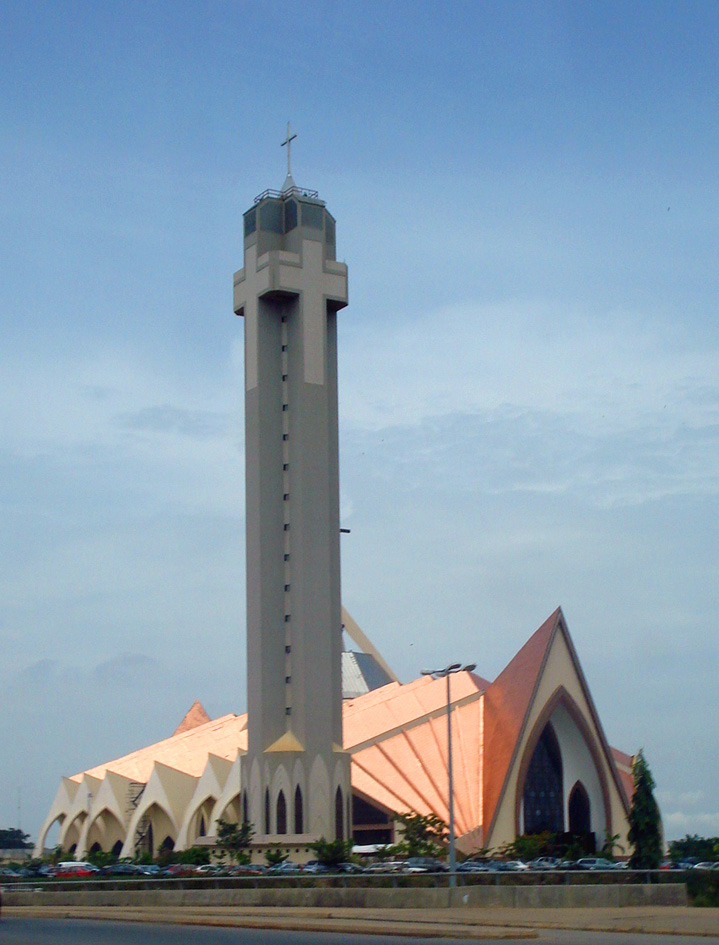
- National Christian Centre, Abuja
- National Christian Centre
- 9°03′07″N 7°29′40″E
- Address: Abuja, FCT
- Country: Nigeria
- Denomination: Non-denominational Christianity
- Website: christianassociationofnigeria.org/national-christian-centre/

History
- Former name: National Ecumenical Centre
- Status: Church
- Founded: 1989
- Dedicated: 2 October 2005 by Peter Akinola, the Anglican Primate of Nigeria

Architecture
- Architectural type: Church
- Style: Postmodern Neo-Gothic
- Completed: 2005

The National Christian Centre (previously known as the National Ecumenical Centre and sometimes known as the National Church of Nigeria) is a non-denominational Christian church building, located in Abuja, the capital of Nigeria.

== History ==
The church was designed in a Postmodern version of the Neo-Gothic style by Nigerian architectural firm Darchiwork Group, located in Lagos.

The project was started around 1989, then lay dormant for several years until 2004, when the Christian Association of Nigeria organized a committee to ensure its speedy completion. The dedication, on 2 October 2005, coincided with the celebration of Nigeria's 45th anniversary as an independent nation.

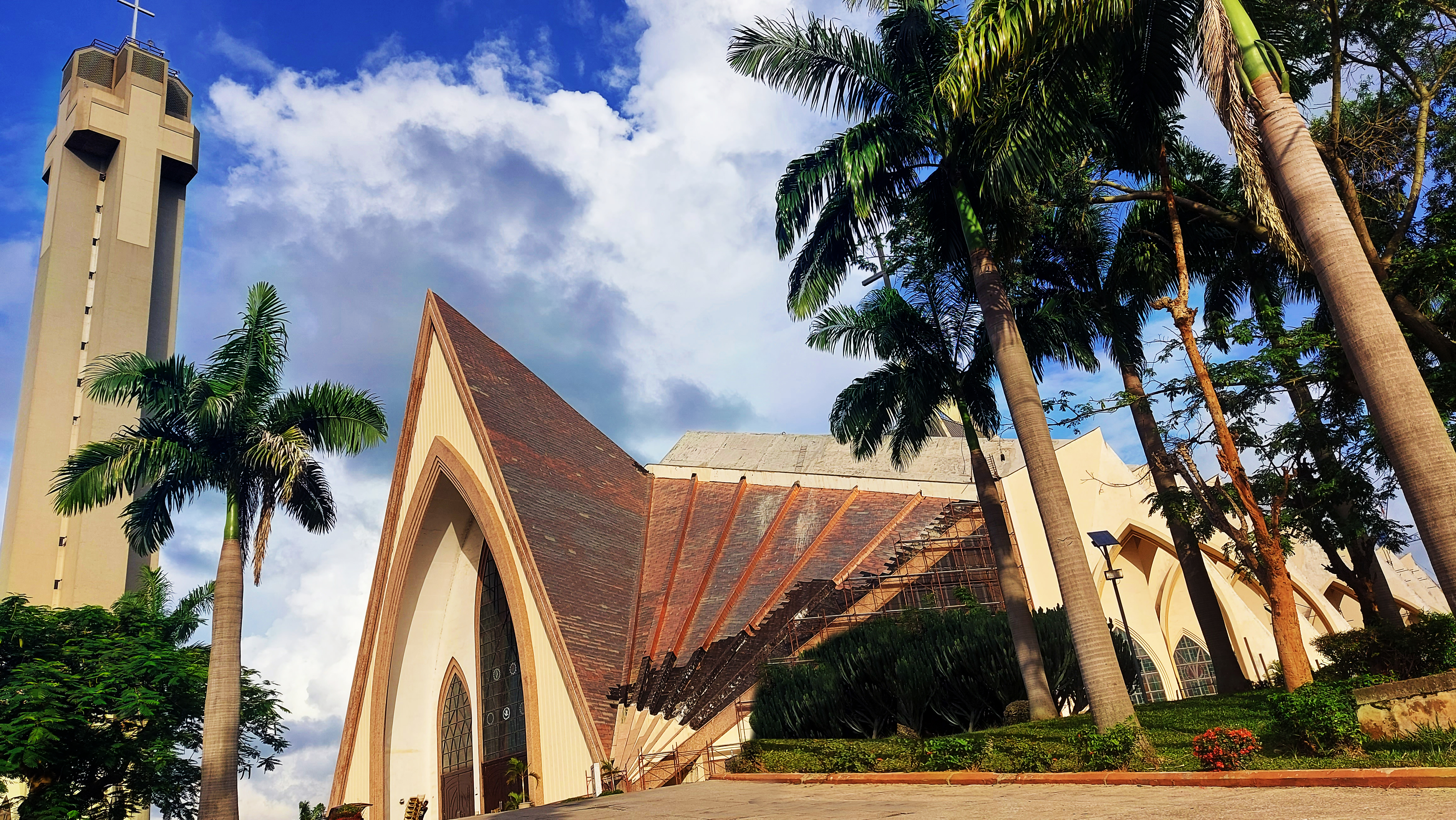
National Christian Centre

The dedication service was presided over by the Most Reverend Peter Akinola, the Anglican Primate of Nigeria.

== Layout and access ==
The church is built in a neo-Gothic style and has several pivoted arches with a wide nave leading to the altar. The altar, placed at the centre of the church completes a full rotation every ten minutes. A pipe organ is fitted to the right wing of the church, close to which sits the choir. Stained glass windows which employ a simple but attractive mix of yellow, green and red colours can be seen all around the church.

When not being used for Christian ceremonies, it is open to the public. Guided tours are available for anyone interested in having a look. In some cases, members of the public are only allowed to tour the church when accompanied by a guide.

== Gallery ==
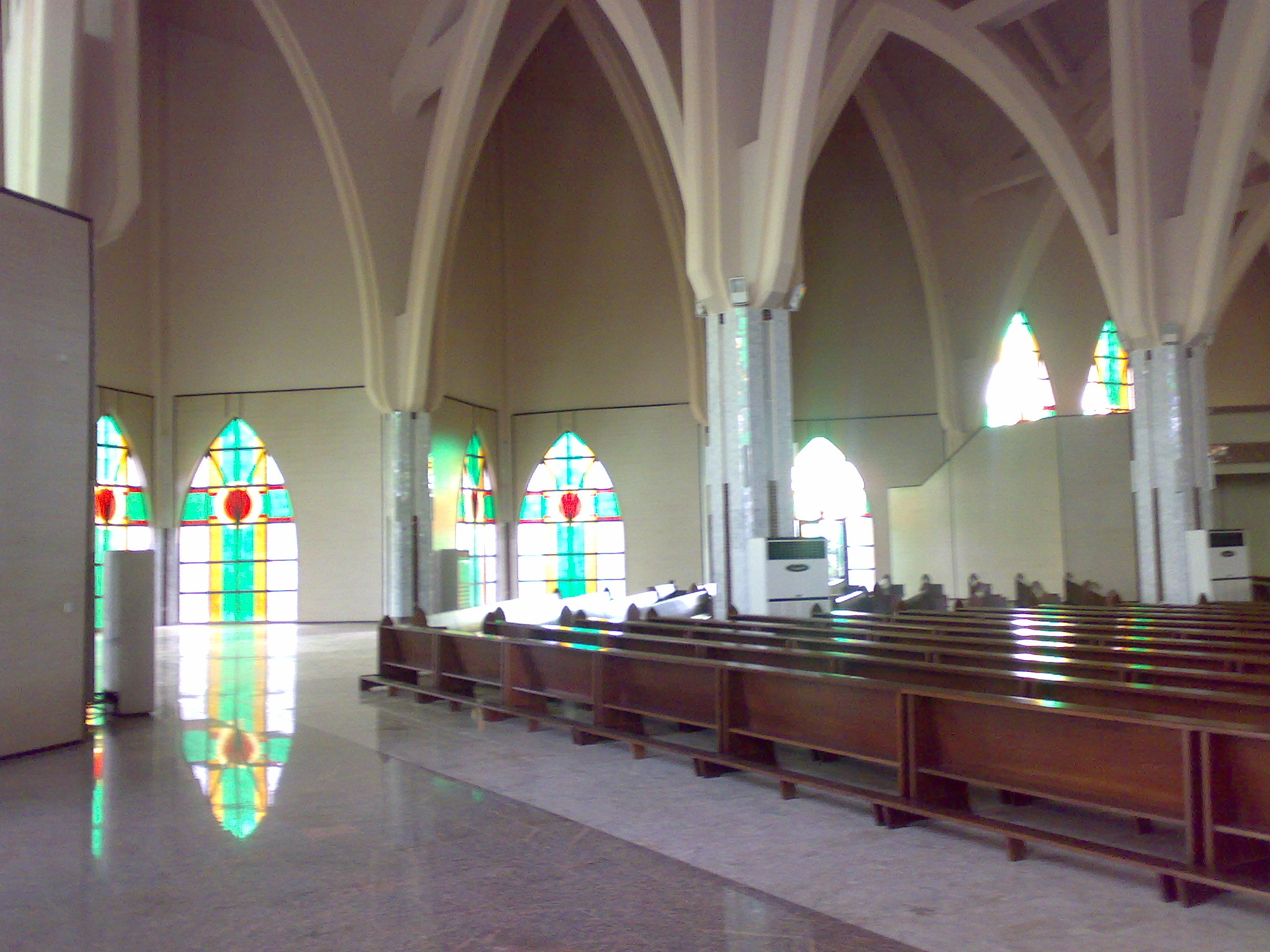
Interior of the church

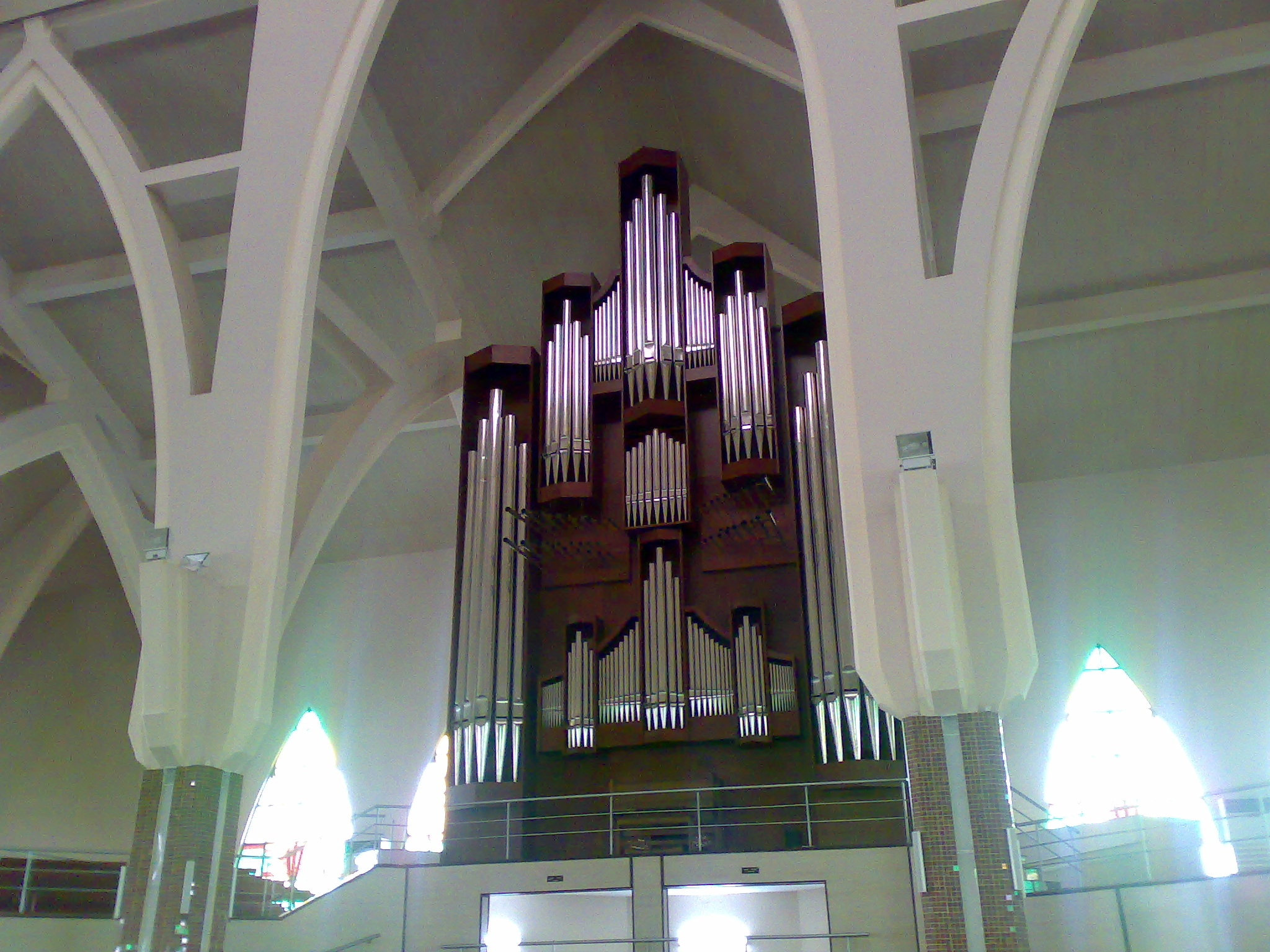
Pipe organ at the right wing of the church

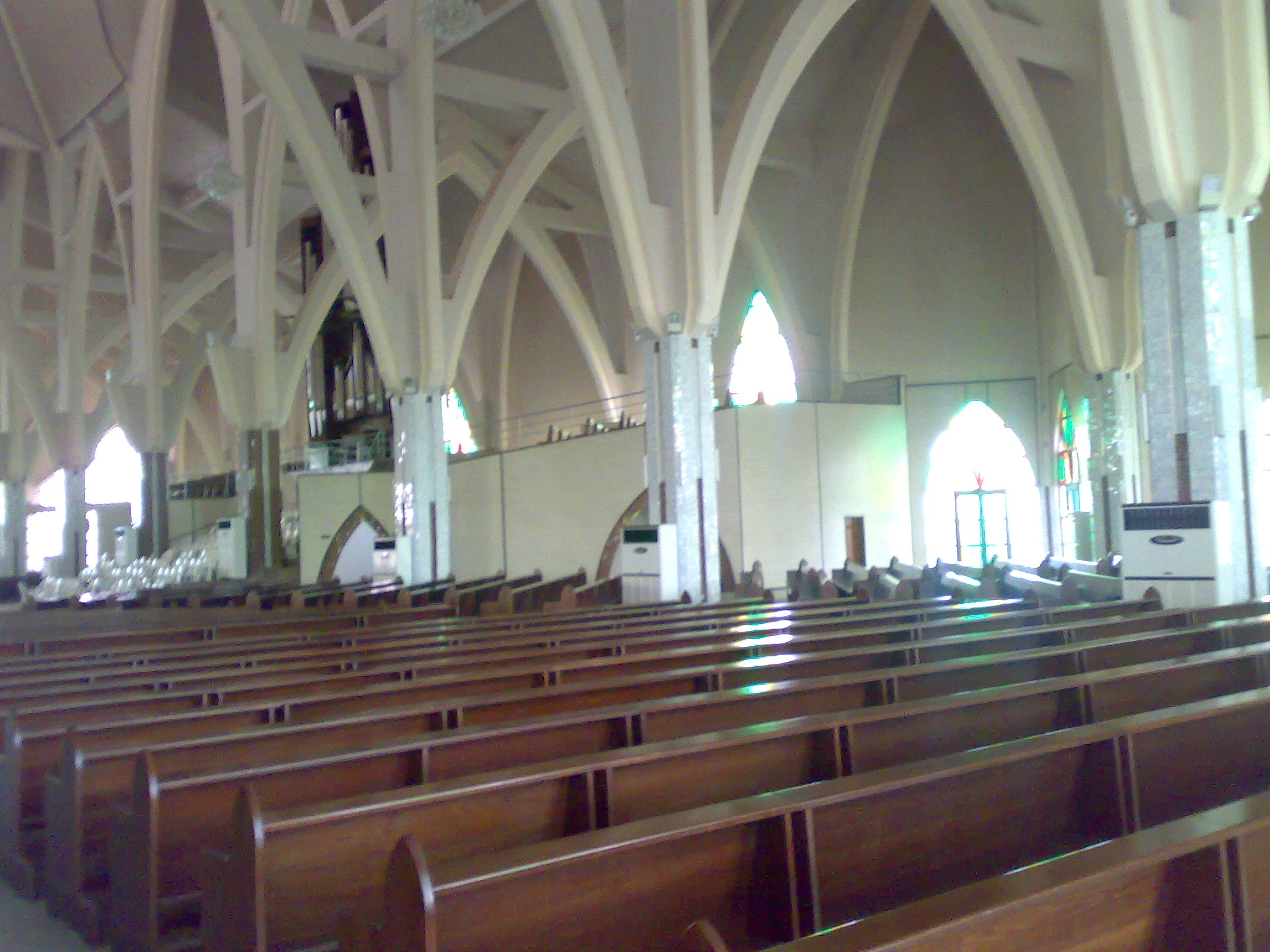
Arches seen in the church interior

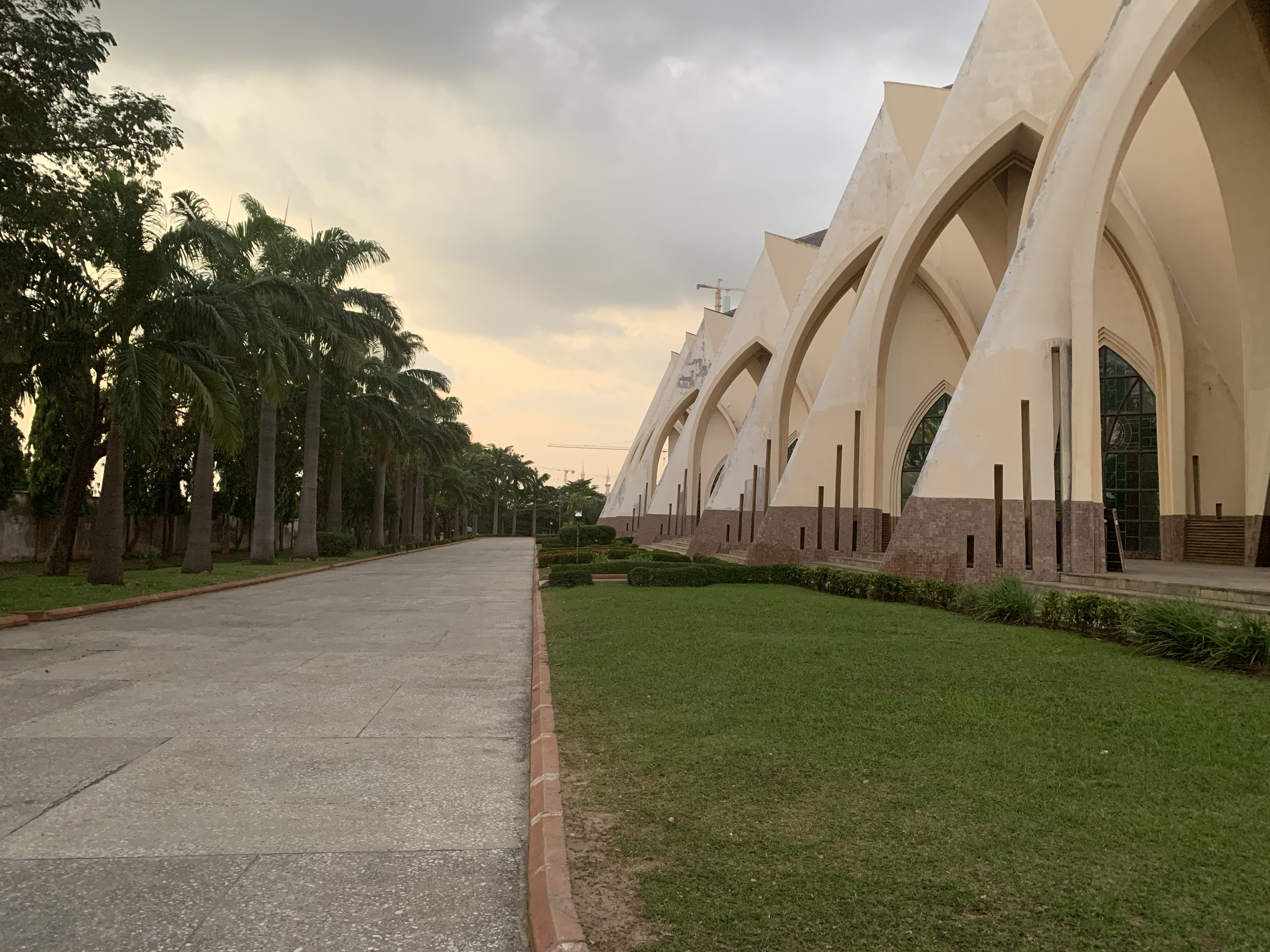
Garden by National church of Nigeria

== See also ==
- Christianity in Nigeria
