= Anglican Diocese of Doko =

Anglican diocese in Nigeria

The Anglican Diocese of Doko is one of eleven dioceses within the Anglican Province of Lokoja, itself one of 14 ecclesiastical provinces within the Church of Nigeria.

The diocese was created in 2009. The proposals of the Provincial Standing Committee led by Bishop Jonah Kolo were accepted by Archbishop Peter Akinola and the Standing Committee of the Church of Nigeria. The election of the first Bishop of Doko, Uriah Kolo took place at Lokoja on 22 May 2009. He was consecrated on 12 July that year.
