= New Apostolic Church in Nigeria =

The New Apostolic Church is a Christian denomination with a significant presence in Nigeria. It has hundreds of thousands of members in Nigeria. It is active in the United States and Europe, too. Nigeria is within the area of District Apostle Michael Ehrich of Southern Germany.

== See also ==
- Christianity in Nigeria
