= Emmanuel Kana Mani =

Nigerian anglican bishop

Emmanuel Kana Mani was an Anglican bishop in Nigeria.

Mani was born on 10 June 1951, in Zuru, Kebbi State. He enlisted in the Nigeria Army in 1968 where he became a military chaplain. He was ordained in 1983. He was elected Bishop of Maiduguri in 1990; and Archbishop of Jos in 2002.

After serving one term of 5 years, he was replaced as Archbishop of Jos by Benjamin Kwashi in 2008. He had a wife, with whom he had six sons. Mani died in 2017.
