= Internally Displaced Person Camp in Lagos =

Refugee camp in Lagos, Nigeria

Internally Displaced Person Camp in Lagos is located in the Ibeju Lekki area of Lagos State, and it was established in the first quarter of the year 2016 by the Federal Government to cater for migrants and internally displaced persons in the state as well as served as a re-integration centre.

The centre was established in partnership with Web of Hearts, which is a non-governmental organization based in Lagos State. The centre was commissioned by Hajiya Hadiza Sani Kangiwa, who is the Honourable Federal Commissioner, National Commission for Refugees, Migrants, and Internally Displaced Persons

According to Hajiya Kangiwa during the commissioning “This centre is to serve as a component of the Assisted Voluntary Return and Reintegration (AVRR) programme. We have set it up in collaboration with Web of Hearts with whom we have recently signed a Memorandum of Understanding to serve as a transit centre where returnee migrants would be provided with counselling services, mentorship, family reunification, skill acquisition, training, temporary accommodation and much more.” Also, the executive director of Web of Hearts, Bose Aggrey believes that the place will motivate stranded Nigerian abroad to return home.
