= Protestantism in Nigeria =

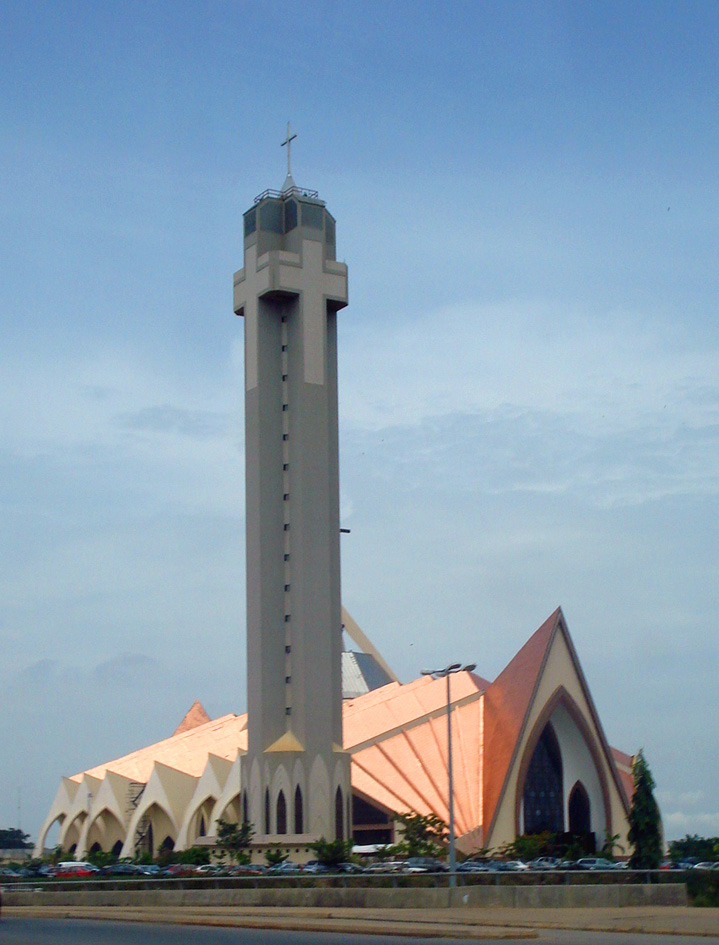
The National Cathedral, Abuja, Nigeria

Protestant Christians in Nigeria constitute about 75% of the Christian population, or about 60 million people. Christianity in the Yoruba areas has traditionally been Protestant. With political independence came African priests in Protestant denominations, although ritual and forms of worship were strictly those of the home country of the original missionaries. The Church of Nigeria, an Anglican denomination, has a church membership of 18 million. Conservative estimates of the size of the Nigerian Baptist Convention claims three million baptized believers and a worshiping community of more than six million. The Presbyterian Church of Nigeria has more than 3.8 million members in the entire country as well as outreaches in the neighbouring countries. The Evangelical Church of West Africa (ECWA) is one of the largest non-governmental organisations in Nigeria, reaching about five million people. It was founded in 1954. It operates more than 110 clinics.

Hundreds of persons in northern and central Nigeria have died in recent years as a result of violence between Christian and Muslim communities. Since the introduction of Sharia law in 12 Northern states, violence between Muslims and Christians has increased in the north. Sharia only applies to Muslims in law.
