= Healthcare services in an African IDP Camps =

Healthcare services

Healthcare services for internally displaced persons in Africa
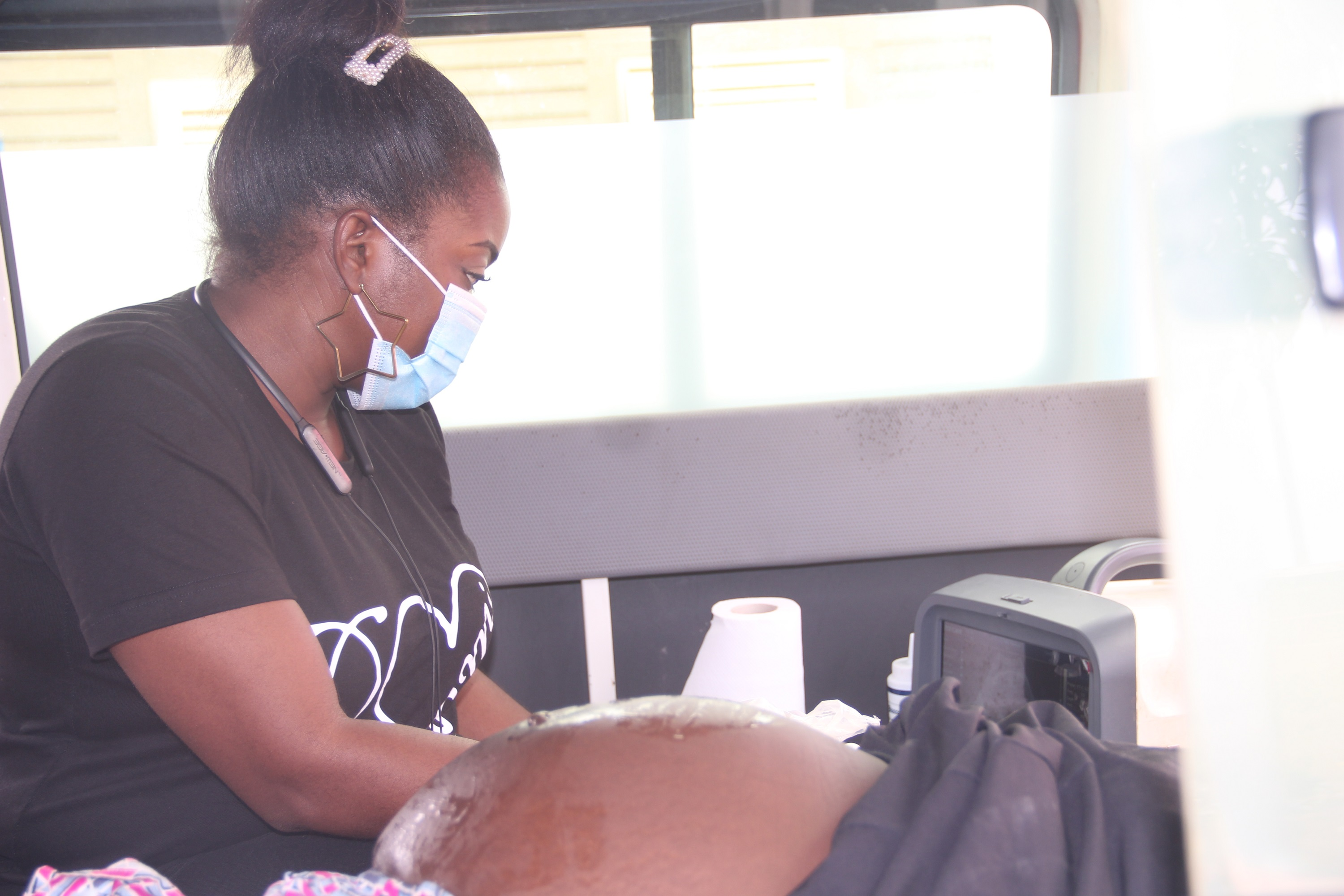
- Healthcare services in an IDP setting

Healthcare services for internally displaced persons in Africa comprise all basic and emergency healthcare, immunization, and maternal and sexual health services, which are administered to citizens who have been displaced by disasters or crises. Internally displaced persons (IDPs) in Africa frequently face a lack of access to structures and systems that provide healthcare services and resources. They rely heavily on humanitarian support.

== Overview ==
Internally displaced persons in Africa are persons who had to flee their homes due to violent crimes, disasters, or wars. They face challenges such as poor food, displacement of families, poor education and lack of freedom.

== Healthcare interventions in African internally displaced persons camps ==
The World Health Organization recommended key strategies for primary healthcare, which include disease prevention, health education, water sanitation, food and nutrition, maternal and child health, immunization, treatment, and the provision of essential drugs. African humanitarian organizations implemented these strategies through disease prevention, food and nutrition provision, maternal and child healthcare services, treatment, and essential drugs.

== Efforts ==
Humanitarian organizations in Africa continuously work to address gaps in interventions that are caused by insecurity, a lack of access to affected areas, and a lack of information.
