= Anglican Diocese of Bida =

Anglican diocese in Nigeria

Coordinates: 9°05′N 6°01′E

The Anglican Diocese of Bida is one of 11 dioceses within the Anglican Province of Lokoja, itself one of 14 ecclesiastical provinces within the Church of Nigeria. The current bishop is the Right Rev. Jonah Kolo
