= Christianity in Niger State =

Christianity is the second largest religion in Niger State, Nigeria, after Islam.

The Roman Catholic Diocese of Minna and of Kontagora (inaugurated 1995) have their seats in the state. Anglican dioceses in Niger State are Bida, Doko, Kontagora, Kutigi and Minna (which was inaugurated in 1990).

Nine churches in Kontagora were set on fire in 2006. Churches were also burned in the state capital Minna and in Gwada in 2009. A bomb attack allegedly by Boko Haram killed three persons in All Christian-Fellowship Mission in Suleja on July 10, 2011.
