= List of internally displaced persons camps in Nigeria =

Internally Displaced Persons (IDP) camps in Nigeria are temporary settlements created to shelter people who have been forced to flee their homes, but remain within Nigeria’s borders. Displacement in Nigeria has grown immensely over the past few decades due to armed conflicts, insurgencies like Boko Haram, environmental disasters, communal violence, and broader governmental challenges. As a result, Nigeria now hosts one of the largest IDP populations in the world, with families often uprooted and left without basic humanitarian services.

These camps vary in size and structure, ranging from formal government-recognized sites to informal settlements built by communities themselves. Across many regions in Nigeria, including Benue, Cross River State, and Abuja, IDP camps face problems such as overcrowding, food shortages, poor sanitation, limited access to healthcare, and lack of schooling for children. Other severe concerns is exposure to sexual and gender-based violence, especially among women and children, and the psychological stress and fatigue associated with prolonged displacement.

Despite efforts from state institutions, international organizations, and local NGOs, conditions in many Nigerian IDP camps remain extremely difficult. Studies point to several issues including gaps in protection, resource shortages, and slow implementation of policies that are meant to safeguard displaced people.

This is a list of Internally displaced persons (IDP) camps in Nigeria.

== Abuja ==
There are five IDP camps in Abuja:

- Lugbe IDP Camp
- Area One IDP Camp
- New Kuchingoro IDP Camp
- Kuje IDP Camp
- Wassa IDP camp

== Lagos ==
- Internally Displaced Person Camp in Lagos

== Borno State ==
- Bakassi IDP camp in Maiduguri

Dalori IDP camp in Maiduguri

== Bibliography ==
Ezikeudu, Chukwudi Charles, Ikechukwu Jonathan Opara, and Etta Oyen Etta. "Public Perception of the Challenges of the Internally Displaced Persons and the Creation of Criminal Groups in Bakassi Local Government Area of Cross River State, Nigeria." Global Journal of Social Sciences 24.2 (2025): 207-28. ProQuest. Web. 29 Oct. 2025.

This article quantitatively and qualitatively investigates the social and economic conditions within Nigerian IDP camps. Although it primarily focuses on the Bakassi Local Government Area, the authors highlight that Nigeria has one of the highest IDP populations in the world for reasons including violent conflicts and environmental crises. The study relies on the Relative Deprivation Theory and Frustration Aggression Theory to argue that human rights issues within IDP populations lead to increased criminal populations within and around IDP camps.

Using quantitative analysis and a variety of surveys/interviews, the authors’ research establishes a correlation between diminished quality of life conditions and increased criminal activity. I agree with this finding, however, one limitation within their research appears in their surveys where percentage adds up to over 100% which should be impossible.

Oriola, Bolanle, and Melanie Moen. "Girl’s Experiences of Sexual Violence in Nigerian Internally Displaced Peoples’ Camps." Gender & Behaviour23.1 (2025): 23073-85. ProQuest. Web. 29 Oct. 2025.

This article investigates the widespread presence and psychological impact of sexual violence among young girls in IDP camps in Abuja, Nigeria. It utilizes a more qualitative approach, interviewing female survivors to uncover the lived experiences of sexual abuse in IDP camps. The findings reveal that the girls in these camps face extreme sexual violence, often from men in authority positions, which leaves the victims powerless and isolated.

This research contributes immensely to a rather underexplored topic of humanitarian studies. Its qualitative approach gives a voice to the marginalized girls who suffered these atrocities which may be obscured in a more quantitative study. However, some limitations that can be viewed is its relatively small sample size and potential interviewer bias which may affect study findings.

This article applies directly to my research by explaining conditions within Nigerian IDP camps. It shows how insecurity, poverty, and gender hierarchies lead way to sexual violence and overall social isolation.

Dombo, Eileen A., and Frederick L. Ahearn. "Displaced People." Encyclopedia of Social Work. June 18, 2024. NASW Press and Oxford University Press. Date of access 30 Oct. 2025, <https://oxfordre.com/socialwork/view/10.1093/acrefore/9780199975839.001.0001/acrefore-9780199975839-e-110>

This reference article from the Oxford University Press discusses internally displaced people as those that are forcibly uprooted but still remain within national borders. It talks about how IDPs now outnumber refugees globally. It examines disaster/conflict driven displacement, the protection gap for IDPs, slow national implementation of protective policy, and the barriers to international aid. The article also discusses how women and children make up the largest percentage of IDPs which gives way to gender based violence and mental health challenges.

This reference article is strong in description due to its broad scope, recency and use of datasets. It provides a clear articulation of the difference between refugees and IDPs and gives readers a clear map of where protection for IDPs isn’t met. The main limitation is that, as an encyclopedia entry, it is descriptive rather than an analysis of country level hypothesis testing.

Overall, this article provides an overview that is key to my research in terms of general understanding of what IDPs are. It also uses Nigeria as an example within the global IDP crisis, showing how poor conditions are prevalent both in Nigeria and internationally.

David, James Ojochenemi. "Trapped in Turmoil: The Developmental Toll of Insurgencies in Nigeria since 2014." International Journal of Research in Business and Social Science, suppl.Special Issue 14.4 (2025): 476-88. ProQuest.Web. 1 Nov. 2025.

This article argues that the new 2014 Nigerian GDP masked insecurities and structural issues that insurgencies soon exposed. By using a human security framework alongside conflict trap theory, it article shows how Boko Haram and the Niger Delta Avengers produced shocks to general livelihood and state productivity. Some of the effects were financial slippage, oil output disruptions, infrastructure damage, agricultural collapse and extreme displacement.

This article is strong in terms of its analysis of economic shocks' effect on human outcomes. It also provides a good explanation as to why financial collapse occurred and why violence/underdevelopment increase simultaneously. A limitation is its use of overlapping shocks(ex. GDP slip and oil disruption). Overall it successfully puts the situation into perspective, explaining why and how Nigeria’s affairs collapsed.

Although only briefly mentioned, IDP camp conditions and populations are closely tied to the insecurity and governance failures that created this complex situation. Specifically, the process by which economic shocks lead to longer displacement and poor IDP camp conditions directly links to my research.

Ibeanu, Okechukwu. “Exiles In Their Own Home: Internal Population Displacement In Nigeria.” African Journal of Political Science / Revue Africaine de Science Politique, vol. 3, no. 2, 1998, pp. 80–97. JSTOR, http://www.jstor.org/stable/23493655. Accessed 1 Nov. 2025.

The author, Okechukwu Ibeanu, reframes the idea of internal displacement as a relation produced when groups lose access to certain things like resources and protection in contexts of violence and insecurity. He argues that the Nigerian state is a central driver of the conflict and displacement prevalent in the country.

The article does a good job of providing a general theory of why displacement occurs in Nigeria, centered on ideas of group security and state violence. It also provides a useful conflict characterization and illustration of events leading to displacement. However, it does use a pre-2000 scope which hinders its relevance when discussing modern IDP camps.

This article provides my research with a theoretical spine of some sort, with the argument that IDP populations are a result of the mismanagement of the state. It also allows me to compare and contrast the author’s 1998 estimate with more modern approaches to understanding the reality of IDP populations and camps.

Acha-Anyi, Paul. "Unmasking the Human Rights Needs of Internally Displaced Persons: A Case Study of Selected States in Nigeria." International Journal of Migration, Health, and Social Care 20.4 (2024): 682-700. ProQuest. Web. 2 Nov. 2025.

This study shifts attention from IDP camps to general internally displaced people within 3 Nigerian communities. It utilizes a cross sectional, quantitative approach, with a structured questionnaire and fieldworkers to identify the IDP population makeup, displacement drivers, and priorities/fears of IDPs. It argues that the basic physiological and safety needs of IDP populations remain unmet.

This article offers a nuanced measurement model for studying IDP populations and includes a large sample size to explain the mentality and reason for displacement of people in Nigeria. This study could be expanded if it used a qualitative component as well. For example, interviews would add even greater depth to the study.

This article applies to my research by highlighting IDP conditions outside of camps, which incorporates an additional caseload whose needs are less visible compared to IDP populations in formal sites.

"Thriving On The Vulnerability Of Others: The Plight Of Benue IDPs." Nigerian Voice, The (Nigeria), sec. News, 15 July 2023. NewsBank: Access World News, https://infoweb.newsbank.com/apps/news/openurl?ctx_ver=z39.88-2004&rft_id=info%3Asid/infoweb.newsbank.com&svc_dat=AWNB&req_dat=0D0CB4EC084DCD35&rft_val_format=info%3Aofi/fmt%3Akev%3Amtx%3Actx&rft_dat=document_id%3Anews/192CF522508A8EE0. Accessed 2 Nov. 2025.

This news article uses eyewitness reporting, advocacy and counts of data to argue that the Benue State faces an extreme IDP crisis due to herder-farmer “war,” weak government management, and unmet service requirements. It discusses housing conditions of internally displaced people and spread of sickness to describe Benue within a moral and government critique. The article also describes the history and drivers of conflict leading to poor conditions and increased number of internally displaced people. Lastly, it harshly critiques the lack of humanitarian response of the Nigerian/Benue government and details the solutions that have the potential to solve the IDP crisis.

This article does a great job at providing vivid descriptions of IDP conditions and harms to the vulnerable IDP population. It also interestingly utilizes a faith-based approach to advocate for greater recognition and support for helping internally displaced people. However, the tone of the article is highly advocacy heavy, which introduces potential bias, and it lacks data to support the statement that epidemics frequently occur throughout the IDP population.

Generally speaking, this article provides my research with ideas about risk multipliers within IDP populations and offers a comparative angle using Benue state to describe IDP trends in Nigeria as a whole.
