= IDP camps in Nigeria =

Internally Displaced Persons (IDP) camps in Nigeria are temporary settlements created to shelter people who have been forced to flee their homes, but remain within Nigeria's borders. Displacement in Nigeria has grown immensely over the past few decades due to armed conflicts, insurgencies like Boko Haram, environmental disasters, communal violence, and broader governmental challenges. As a result, Nigeria now hosts one of the largest IDP populations in the world, with families often uprooted and left without basic humanitarian services.

These camps vary in size and structure, ranging from formal government-recognized sites to informal settlements built by communities themselves. Across many regions in Nigeria, including Benue, Cross River State, and Abuja, IDP camps face problems such as overcrowding, food shortages, poor sanitation, limited access to healthcare, and lack of schooling for children. Other severe concerns is exposure to sexual and gender-based violence, especially among women and children, and the psychological stress and fatigue associated with prolonged displacement.

Despite efforts from state institutions, international organizations, and local NGOs, conditions in many Nigerian IDP camps remain extremely difficult. Studies point to several issues including gaps in protection, resource shortages, and slow implementation of policies that are meant to safeguard displaced people.

== Historical background ==
Nigeria's current IDP crisis has evolved due to overlapping conflicts, economic pressures, and environmental shocks that have developed since the early-2000s. Today, the country hosts over 3 million internally displaced people along with thousands of refugees which, in total, makes up 3% of the world's forcibly displaced population. Climate-related disasters such as extreme flooding and drought from the 2010s to present day, combined with constant structural unemployment and food insecurity, have contributed to repeated waves of displacement.

The Nigerian IDP challenge was triggered most directly through the Boko Haram insurgency in 2009 where massive attacks, village destruction, and abductions in northeast Borno State caused a massive expansion in IDP populations. Currently, data still shows that the majority of Nigerian IDPs come from Borno.

In 2012, Nigeria was a victim of massive floods due to heavy rainfall that impacted many surrounding countries as well. This environmental disaster killed hundreds, injured thousands, and displaced many more. Following 2012, Nigeria was hit with the Benue Floods of 2017, which is estimated to have displaced over 100,000 people. Ultimately, in 2022 Nigeria was unfortunately affected by what is widely considered, the worst floods of the decade. This displaced over 1 million people across multiple states in Nigeria.

Economic instability also plays a central role in the expansion of Nigeria's IDP crisis. Persistent unemployment, uneven resource distribution, and environmental degradation has intensified social conflict and driven people from their homes. Nigeria's weak governance structures have produced long-term inequality and limited civilian access to jobs which in turn fuels frustration and violent uprisings that lead to displacement. This instability is especially visible in the Niger Delta, where oil extraction has damaged farmlands and fishing grounds, effectively destroying local livelihoods and creating conflict between communities and the state.

== Conditions ==
Conditions within IDP camps in Nigeria vary widely across regions, but most can be characterized with severe humanitarian deficiencies. Despite Nigeria hosting one of the largest IDP populations in the world, camps often lack the infrastructure and resources required to meet the basic needs of people living within them. IDP settlements face harsh overcrowding, food insecurity, and lack of access to healthcare and education, creating environments that intensify individual vulnerability. Poor living conditions within these camps can be correlated with a rise in criminal activity as responses to unmet needs contribute to insecurity both in and around camp areas.

Gender-based violence is big concern across Nigerian IDP camps. Studies document widespread sexual violence against young girls, often carried out by authority figures in the camps or men in positions of power. Survivors reported psychological trauma, social isolation, and limited access to justice, showing a broader gender hierarchy and protection gaps within camp oversight. Women and children make up a large share of IDP populations which makes them particularly vulnerable to exploitation and neglect.

Nigerian IDP camps also suffer from little government oversight and slow implementation of protective policies. Nigerian national response has struggled to provide stable service delivery and camps often lack proper sanitation, shelter materials, and consistent food distribution. Reports have described camps with deteriorating housing, rapid spread of disease, and insufficient humanitarian access.

Economic instability and internal conflict further worsen IDP camp conditions, as displaced populations remain in camps longer than expected. People are left without pathways to reintegration.
