= Pipe organs of Brighton and Hove =

Brighton and Hove has numerous notable pipe organs, from the small early 19th-century organs to the large 20th-century instruments in the large churches.

== Brighton ==
=== Churches ===
==== The Chapel Royal ====
The organ of the Chapel Royal was built in 1883 by the famous London firm of Henry Willis & Sons to a specification of twenty stops on two manuals and pedals: a Choir organ of six or seven stops was also prepared for. It is an interesting example of a small Willis organ, of which there are relatively few.

==== St Peter's ====
The organ of St Peter's was built in 1888 by the famous London firm of Henry Willis & Sons for the Hampstead Conservatoire of Music with forty-three stops spread over four manuals and pedals. The same firm brought it to Brighton in 1910: the instrument it replaced, built in the 1820s by W. A. A. Nicholls and enlarged in 1877 by W. M. Hedgeland, was moved in 1910 to the church of St Paul, St Albans. As of February 2022 the organ has been removed, parts of it to be reused at St John's College Chapel, Cambridge.

==== St Martin's, Lewes Rd ====
The organ of St. Martin's was installed in 1876 by William Hill & Sons of London, to a specification of 29 stops over 3 manuals and pedals. The instrument was completed in 1888, having been built as funds permitted. It is an historically important instrument, being tonally unaltered from its original state, and known for its fine, clear sound, an influence of Hill's experiences in Germany, and the firm's early association with Mendelssohn. It has a rather heavy mechanical action, and an intricate, albeit incomplete case.

==== St. Mary the Virgin, Kemp Town ====
The first organ at St Mary the Virgin Church was a small organ built by Henry Lincoln of eleven stops on two manuals with 13 notes of pulldown pedals. This was replaced in 1855 by a new organ by Henry Bevington, which was enlarged to three manuals and 24 stops in 1878: four stops were added in 1904. A further four were added in 1965 by Cedric Arnold, Williamson & Hyatt and two digital stops were added in 1980. Pictures and a recording may be heard here.

==== St.Bartholomew, Ann Street ====
The current instrument, in two matching cases either side of the west gallery, |url=http://www.npor.org.uk/NPORView.html?RI=A00294 is an enlargement of the 1906 instrument by Morgan & Smith. The organ has 37 stops over three manuals and pedals and benefits well from the cavernous acoustic in this immense building, the highest nave interior of any church or cathedral building in the British Isles, at 135 feet, and the organ makes a far better impression than its stoplist might at first lead one to expect.

==== St. Paul, West Street ====
An incomplete but nonetheless impressive organ |url=http://www.npor.org.uk/NPORView.html?RI=N15513 intended as a four-manual design with 48 stops, mostly by Alfred Hunter rebuilt in 1968 by Hill, Norman and Beard.

==== Brighthelm Church and Community Centre ====
A Walker instrument 1921 rebuilt in 1985 by Hill, Norman and Beard with 57 speaking stops. |url=http://www.npor.org.uk/NPORView.html?RI=A00537

=== Public buildings ===
==== The Dome Pavilion ====
The first pipe organ in the Dome's Concert Hall was built in 1870 by the famous London firm of Henry Willis & Sons to a specification of forty-four stops spread over four manuals and pedals. Unfortunately, this modestly sized but nonetheless splendid instrument was removed in 1935 for the great rebuilding of the theatre and was never returned, but broken up for parts. The instrument which replaced it, a large 'Christie' organ of fifty extended ranks, built in 1935 by the firm of Hill, Norman and Beard, incorporating a string division from the short-lived organ at Glyndebourne, is effective in both classical and theatre styles. This large instrument has four manuals and one hundred and seventy-eight stops obtained by extension and unification of numerous ranks, plus numerous percussion effects. It has recently been restored by David Wells of Liverpool.

== Hove ==
=== Churches ===
==== All Saints ====
All Saints Church, a large and fine building designed by Pearson, is fortunate to have a suitably fine organ, built by the London firm of William Hill & Son in 1894 to a specification of fourteen stops on two manuals and pedals at a cost of £882. It was enlarged in 1905 to forty-eight stops on three manuals and pedals at a further cost of £1908. It was provided with an ornate case in 1915 to a design by Pearson's son, Frank: the instrument was restored in 1987 by Mander Organs.

=== Public buildings ===
==== The Town Hall ====
The Town Hall was designed by Alfred Waterhouse and built in 1882. In 1897, a new pipe organ of thirty-six stops on four manuals and pedals, designed by John Stainer and built by the famous London firm of Henry Willis & Sons, was provided: it was closely similar to the Willis in the Brighton Dome. The instrument was sold in 1961, amidst much local controversy, to Haberdashers' Aske's Boys' School in Elstree, Hertfordshire: however, without this move, the organ would no longer exist, as the hall was completely destroyed by fire in 1966.
