= Anglican Diocese of Maiduguri =

Anglican diocese in Nigeria

The Anglican Diocese of Maiduguri is one of ten within the Anglican Province of Jos, itself one of 14 ecclesiastical provinces within the Church of Nigeria. Its first bishop Emmanuel Kana Mani became Archbishop of the Province while the current bishop is Emmanuel Morris.
