= Jonah Kolo =

Anglican bishop in Nigeria

Jonah Kolo is an Anglican bishop in Nigeria. He is the current Bishop of Bida, one of 11 dioceses within the Anglican Province of Lokoja, itself one of 14 provinces within the Church of Nigeria.
