= Christianity in Borno State =

Christianity is a religious minority in Borno State, Nigeria.

== Discrimination and persecution ==
Christians in Borno State have faced systemic discrimination and violent persecution over the years. In 2000, 15 Christians were killed and four churches were burned in Damboa; in 2006, at least 65 Christians were killed and 57 churches were destroyed in Maiduguri during riots amid the Jyllands-Posten Muhammad cartoons controversy.

Since the early 2000s, Islamist militant groups, particularly Boko Haram and its splinter faction Islamic State West Africa Province, have extensively targeted Christian communities. Boko Haram has been responsible for mass killings, kidnappings, and church attacks during its insurgency, leading to the displacement of thousands of Borno Christians.

In addition to violent persecution, state government policies have also marginalized Christians with allegations of faith-based discrimination in the provision of humanitarian aid to Internally Displaced Persons. Reports indicate that Christian IDPs in government-controlled camps receive less support compared to their Muslim counterparts, with some being pressured to convert to Islam in exchange for assistance. Additionally, in the late 2010s and 2020s, the Borno State Geographic Information System has demolished churches in Maiduguri, citing zoning violations in moves that many Christian leaders see as targeted persecution.

== Geographic distribution ==
Several Christian denominations operate in Borno State including the Christ Apostolic Church, Church of Christ in Nations, Evangelical Church Winning All, Lutheran Church of Christ in Nigeria, and Nigerian Baptist Convention. In addition, the Church of Nigeria's Anglican Diocese of Maiduguri and Latin Church's Roman Catholic Diocese of Maiduguri are based in Borno State.

== See also ==
- Nigerian sectarian violence
