= Christianity in Kano State =

Christians are a minority in Kano State, Nigeria, where Sharia is valid but does not affect any Christian in practicing their religion as is stated in the Section 38 (1) of the 1999 constitution and Article 18 of the Universal Declaration of Human Right, which provides: “Every person shall be entitled to freedom of thought, conscience and religion, including freedom to change his religion or belief, and freedom (either alone or in community with others, and in public or in private) to manifest and propagate his religion or belief in worship, teaching, practice and observance.”. The conflict between religions in Nigeria takes place in the state, too but Kano State Government tries to take quick action for the purpose of restoring peace, together with the Nigeria Police Force (NPF). Christian schoolgirls of public and private schools have the right as Nigerians to wear type of dress according to the dress-code of the schools.

== See also ==
- Roman Catholic Diocese of Kano
