= Christianity in Kaduna State =

Christianity is the second largest religion after Islam, in Kaduna state, representing approximately 49% of the population. This estimate is based on the fact that 9 out of the state's 23 local governments are predominantly Christian. Islam, on the other hand, is estimated to constitute 50% or more of the state's population, with Muslims predominantly residing in the 14 local government areas that have the largest population of the state. The state is home to the Roman Catholic Diocese of Zaria, the Roman Catholic Archdiocese of Kaduna, and the Roman Catholic Diocese of Kafanchan.

Additionally, there is the Church of Nigeria's ecclesiastical province of Kaduna. The Church of Christ has branches throughout the state. Within the state Pentecostal ministries, there are megachurches such as the Throneroom (Trust) Ministry founded by Emmanuel Nuhu Kure and the Winners' Chapel founded by David Oyedepo.

Kaduna State is divided between Christians and Muslims with both religious groups constituting around 50% of the population; Sharia law is applicable in areas with a Muslim majority. There is an Interfaith Mediation Center. In 2002, the Religious Leaders of Kaduna signed the Kaduna Peace Declaration. In 2002, the state carried out the first execution under Islamic law in the twenty-first century.

== See also ==
- Persecution of Christians
- Religion in Kaduna State
