= List of provinces, dioceses and bishops in the Church of Nigeria in 2021 =

List of Anglican bishops in Nigeria

This is a list of provinces, dioceses, archbishops and bishops in the Church of Nigeria, Anglican Communion, in 2025.

The church has 14 Provinces in Nigeria, each with an Archbishop. Each Province is divided into dioceses; there were 162 dioceses in Nigeria, each with a bishop. Each Archbishop is also the bishop of one of the dioceses in his Province.

The pre-eminent Archbishop, The Primate of All Nigeria, is chosen from the 14 Archbishops, and becomes Bishop of Abuja.

The Primate is Henry Ndukuba, elected in 2020.

== Archbishops in the Church of Nigeria ==
1
2
3
4
5
6
7
8
9
10
11
12
13
14

Province	Archbishop
Archbishop of Aba	Isaac Nwaobia
Archbishop of Abuja	Henry Chukwudum Ndukuba
Archbishop of Bendel	Cyril Odiboroghene Odutemu
Archbishop of Enugu	Sosthenes Ikechukwu Eze
Archbishop of Ibadan	Segun Okubadejo
Archbishop of Jos	Markus Ibrahim
Archbishop of Kaduna	Timothy Yahaya
Archbishop of Kwara	Israel Afolabi Amoo
Archbishop of Lagos	Michael Fape
Archbishop of Lokoja	Daniel Abu Yisa
Archbishop of the Niger	Alexander Ibezim
Archbishop of Niger Delta	Blessing Enyindah
Archbishop of Ondo	Christopher Tayo Omotunde
Archbishop of Owerri	David Onuoha

== Bishops in the Church of Nigeria ==
The 161 diocesan bishops are listed below.

1
2
3
4
5
6
7
8
9
10
11
12
13
14
15
16
17
18
19
20
21
22
23
24
25
26
27
28
29
30
31
32
33
34
35
36
37
38
39
40
41
42
43
44
45
46
47
48
49
50
51
52
53
54
55
56
57
58
59
60
61
62
63
64
65
66
67
68
69
70
71
72
73
74
75
76
77
78
79
80
81
82
83
84
85
86
87
88
89
90
91
92
93
94
95
96
97
98
99
100
101
102
103
104
105
106
107
108
109
110
111
112
113
114
115
116
117
118
119
120
121
122
123
124
125
126
127
128
129
130
131
132
133
134
135
136
137
138
139
140
141
142
143
144
145
146
147
148
149
150
151
152
153
154
155
156
157
158
159
160
161

Diocese	Province	Bishop
Diocese of Aba	Province of Aba	Christian Ugwuzor
Diocese of Aba Ngwa North	Province of Aba	Nathan Kanu
Diocese of Abakaliki	Province of Enugu	Monday Nkwoagu
Diocese of Abuja	Province of Abuja	Henry Ndukuba
Diocese of Afikpo	Province of Enugu	Paul Udogu
Diocese of Aguata	Province of the Niger	Samuel Ezefor
Diocese of Ahoada	Province of Niger Delta	Clement Ekpeye
Diocese of Ajayi Crowther	Province of Ibadan	Olugbenga Oduntan
Diocese of Akoko	Province of Ondo	Jacob O.B. Bada
Diocese of Akoko Edo	Province of Bendel	Ebenezer Saiki Omeiza
Diocese of Akure	Province of Ondo	Simeon Borokini
Diocese of Amichi	Province of the Niger	Ephraim Ikeakor
Diocese of Arochukwu/Ohafia	Province of Aba	Johnson Onuoha
Diocese of Asaba	Province of Bendel	Kingsley Chukwukamadu Obuh
Diocese of Awgu/Aninri	Province of Enugu	Benson Ndubuisi Chukwunweike
Diocese of Awka	Province of the Niger	Alexander Ibezim
Diocese of Awori	Province of Lagos	J Akin Atere
Diocese of Badagry	Province of Lagos	Joseph Adeyemi
Diocese of Bari	Province of Kaduna	Ramdi Wonole
Diocese of Bauchi	Province of Jos	Musa Tula
Diocese of Benin	Province of Bendel	Peter O. Joshua Imasuen
Diocese of Bida	Province of Lokoja	Jonah G. Kolo
Diocese of Bukuru	Province of Jos	Jwan Zhumbes
Diocese of Calabar	Province of Niger Delta	Nneoyi Onen Egbe
Diocese of Damaturu	Province of Jos	Yohannah A Audu
Diocese on the Niger	Province of the Niger	Owen Chidozie Nwokolo
Diocese of Doko	Province of Lokoja	Uriah Kolo
Diocese of Dutse	Province of Kaduna	Markus Yohanna Danbinta
Diocese of Egba	Province of Lagos	Emmanuel Adekunle
Diocese of Egba West	Province of Lagos	Samuel Ogundeji
Diocese of Egbu	Province of Owerri	Geoffrey Okoroafor
Diocese of Eha-Amufu Missionary	Province of Enugu	Daniel Nkemjika Olinya
Diocese of Ekiti	Province of Ondo	Christopher Tayo Omotunde
Diocese of Ekiti Kwara	Province of Kwara	Andrew O.A Ajayi
Diocese of Ekiti Oke	Province of Ondo	Isaac Olubowale
Diocese of Ekiti West	Province of Ondo	Cornelius Adagbada
Diocese of Ekwulobia	Province of Onitsha	Peter Ebere Okpaleke
Diocese of Enugu	Province of Enugu	Samuel Obiajulu Ike
Diocese of Enugu North	Province of Enugu	Sosthenes Ikechukwu Eze
Diocese of Esan	Province of Bendel	Rt. Rev. Gabriel Oseikhuemen Elabor
Diocese of Etche	Province of Niger Delta	Precious Nwala
Diocese of Etsako	Province of Bendel	Felix Unuokhe Olorunfemi
Diocese of Evo	Province of Niger Delta	Innocent U. Ordu
Diocese of Gboko	Province of Abuja	Emmanuel Nyitsse
Diocese of Gombe	Province of Jos	Cletus Tambari
Diocese of Gusau	Province of Kaduna	John Garba Danbinta
Diocese of Gwagwalada	Province of Abuja	Moses Tabwaye
Diocese of Ibadan	Province of Ibadan	Joseph Akinfenwa
Diocese of Ibadan North	Province of Ibadan	Williams Oluwarotimi Aladekugbe
Diocese of Ibadan South	Province of Ibadan	Akintunde Popoola
Diocese of Idah	Province of Lokoja	Joseph N. Musa
Diocese of Ideato	Province of Owerri	Caleb Maduoma
Diocese of Idoani	Province of Ondo	Ezekiel Dahunsi
Diocese of Ife	Province of Ibadan	Olubunmi A Akinlade
Diocese of Ife East	Province of Ibadan	Oluseyi Oyelade
Diocese of Ifo	Province of Lagos	Nathaniel Oladejo Ogundipe
Diocese of Igbomina	Province of Kwara	Emmanuel Adekola
Diocese of Igbomina-West	Province of Kwara	Olajide Adebayo
Diocese of Ihiala	Province of the Niger	Israel Kelue Okoye
Diocese of Ijebu	Province of Lagos	Peter Rotimi Oludipe
Diocese of Ijebu-North	Province of Lagos	Solomon Kuponu
Diocese of Ijebu-South West	Province of Lagos	Babatunde Ogunbanwo
Diocese of Ijesa North East	Province of Ibadan	Joseph Olusola
Diocese of Ijesha North Missionary	Province of Ibadan	Isaac Oluyamo
Diocese of Ijumu	Province of Lokoja	Paul Olarewaju Ojo
Diocese of Ikara	Province of Kaduna	Yusuf Ishaya Janfalan
Diocese of Ikeduru	Province of Owerri	Emmanuel Maduwike
Diocese of Ika	Province of Bendel	Godfrey I. Ekpenisi
Diocese of Ikwerre	Province of Niger Delta	Blessing Enyindah
Diocese of Ikwo	Province of Enugu	Kenneth Ifemene
Diocese of Ikwuano	Province of Aba	Chigozirim Onyegbule
Diocese of Ilaje	Province of Ondo	Fredrick Olugbemi
Diocese of Ile-Oluji	Province of Ondo	Abel Oluyemi Ajibodu
Diocese of Ilesa	Province of Ibadan	Dapo Asaju
Diocese of Ilesa South West	Province of Ibadan	Samuel Egbebunmi
Diocese of Irele-Eseodo	Province of Ondo	Joshua Sunday Oyinlola
Diocese of Isi Mbano	Province of Owerri	Godson Udochukwu Ukanwa
Diocese of Isiala-Ngwa	Province of Aba	Temple O. Nwaogu
Diocese of Isiala-Ngwa South	Province of Aba	Isaac Nwaobia
Diocese of Isuikwuato	Province of Aba	Manasses C.I Okere
Diocese of Jalingo	Province of Jos	Foreman Nedison
Diocese of Jebba	Province of Kwara	Oluwaseun A. Aderogba
Diocese of Jos	Province of Jos	Benjamin Kwashi
Diocese of Kabba	Province of Lokoja	Steven Akobe
Diocese of Kaduna	Province of Kaduna	Timothy Yahaya
Diocese of Kafanchan	Province of Abuja	Markus Madugu Dogo
Diocese of Kano	Province of Kaduna	Zakka Nyam Lalle
Diocese of Katsina	Province of Kaduna	Nuhu Yohanna
Diocese of Kebbi	Province of Kaduna	Edmund E. Akanya
Diocese of Kontagora	Province of Lokoja	Jonah Ibrahim
Diocese of Kubwa	Province of Abuja	Duke Akamisoko
Diocese of Kutigi	Province of Lokoja	Jeremiah Kolo
Diocese of Kwara	Province of Kwara	S.T.G. Adewole
Diocese of Kwoi	Province of Abuja	Paul Zamani
Diocese of Lafia	Province of Abuja	Godwin Adeyi Robinson
Diocese of Lagos	Province of Lagos	Gabriel Senasu Okupevi
Diocese of Lagos Mainland	Province of Lagos	Akinpelu Johnson
Diocese of Lagos West	Province of Lagos	James Olusola Odedeji
Diocese of Langtang	Province of Jos	Stanley Fube
Diocese of Lokoja	Province of Lokoja	Emmanuel Sokowamju Egbunu
Diocese of Maiduguri	Province of Jos	Emmanuel Morris
Diocese of Makurdi	Province of Abuja	Nathan Nyitar Inyom
Diocese of Mbaise	Province of Owerri	Chamberlain Chinedu Ogunedo
Diocese of Mbamili	Province of the Niger	Henry Okeke
Diocese of Minna	Province of Lokoja	Daniel Abu Yisa
Diocese of Ndokwa	Province of Bendel	Festus Uzorka Nwafili
Diocese of New Bussa	Province of Kwara	Israel Afolabi Amoo
Diocese of Ngbo	Province of Enugu	Godwin Anyigor Awoke
Diocese of Niger Delta	Province of Niger Delta	Ralph Ebirien
Diocese of Niger Delta North	Province of Niger Delta	Wisdom Budu Ihunwo
Diocese of Niger Delta West	Province of Niger Delta	Emmanuel Oko-Jaja
Diocese of Niger West	Province of the Niger	Johnson Ekwe
Diocese of Nike	Province of Enugu	Christian Onyeka Onyia
Diocese of Nnewi	Province of the Niger	Ndubuisi Obi
Diocese of Northern Izon	Province of Niger Delta	Funkuro Godrules Amgbare
Diocese of Nsukka	Province of Enugu	Aloysius Agbo
Diocese of Offa	Province of Kwara	Solomon Akanbi
Diocese of Ogbaru	Province of the Niger	Prosper Afam Amah
Diocese of Ogbia	Province of Niger Delta	James Oruwori
Diocese of Ogbomoso	Province of Ibadan	Titus Babatunde Olayinka
Diocese of Ogoni	Province of Niger Delta	Solomon Gberegbara
Diocese of Ogori-Magongo	Province of Lokoja	Festus Davies
Diocese of Ohaji/Egbema	Province of Owerri	Chidi Collins Oparaojiaku
Diocese of Oji River	Province of Enugu	Ikechukwu Egbuonu
Diocese of Oke-Ogun	Province of Ibadan	Cornelius Adagbada
Diocese of Oke-Osun	Province of Ibadan	Oluwagbemiro Fabuluje
Diocese of Okene	Province of Lokoja	Emmanuel Onsachi
Diocese of Okigwe	Province of Owerri	Edward Osuegbu
Diocese of Okigwe South	Province of Owerri	David Onuoha
Diocese of Okrika	Province of Niger Delta	Tubokosemie Abere
Diocese of Oleh	Province of Bendel	John Usiwoma Aruakpor
Diocese of Omu-Aran	Province of Kwara	Festus Oyetola Sobanke
Diocese of On the Coast	Province of Ondo	Seyi Pirisola
Diocese of On the Lake	Province of Owerri	Chijioke Oti
Diocese of Ondo	Province of Ondo	Stephen Oni
Diocese of Orlu	Province of Owerri	Benjamin Chinedum Okeke
Diocese of Oru	Province of Owerri	Geoffrey Chukwunenye
Diocese of Osun	Province of Ibadan	Olugbenga Babatunji
Diocese of Osun North	Province of Ibadan	Abiodun Olaoye
Diocese of Osun North East	Province of Ibadan	Ebenezer Akorede Okuyelu
Diocese of Otukpo	Province of Abuja	David Bello
Diocese of Owerri	Province of Owerri	Chukwuma C. Oparah
Diocese of Owo	Province of Ondo	Stephen Ayodeji Fagbemi
Diocese of Oyo	Province of Ibadan	Kemi Oduntan
Diocese of Pankshin	Province of Jos	Olumuyiwa Ajayi
Diocese of Remo	Province of Lagos	Michael Fape
Diocese of Sabongidda-Ora	Province of Bendel	Augustine Ehijimetor Ohilebo
Diocese of Sapele	Province of Bendel	Blessing Erifeta
Diocese of Sokoto	Province of Kaduna	Idris Ado Zubairu
Diocese of Udi	Province of Enugu	Chjioke Augustine Aneke
Diocese of Ughelli	Province of Bendel	Cyril Odiboroghene Odutemu
Diocese of Ukwa	Province of Aba	Samuel Kelechi Eze
Diocese of Umuahia	Province of Aba	Geoffrey Ibeabuchi
Diocese of Uyo	Province of Niger Delta	Owen Ukafia
Diocese of Warri	Province of Bendel	Christian Esezi Ide
Diocese of Western Izon	Province of Bendel	Victor Ebipade Okporu
Diocese of Wusasa	Province of Kaduna	Alkali Titus
Diocese of Yewa	Province of Lagos	Michael Adebayo Oluwarohunbi
Diocese of Yola	Province of Jos	Markus Ibrahim
Diocese of Zaki-Biam	Province of Abuja	Jezreel Vandeh
Diocese of Zaria	Province of Kaduna	Ishaya Baba
Diocese of Zonkwa	Province of Abuja	Jacob Kwashi
