= List of bishops in the Church of Nigeria in 2007 =

List of Anglican bishops in Nigeria

This is a list of the archbishops and bishops in the Church of Nigeria, Anglican Communion, in post in 2007.

In 2007, the church had 10 provinces in Nigeria, each with an archbishop. Each province is divided into dioceses; there were 138 dioceses in Nigeria (and 3 external mission dioceses), each with a bishop. Each archbishop is also the bishop of one of the dioceses in his province.

The pre-eminent archbishop, the Primate of All Nigeria, is chosen from the archbishops, and becomes Bishop of Abuja.

The primate in 2007 was Peter Akinola, who served from 2000 to 2010.

== Archbishops ==
1. Peter J. Akinola was the Anglican Archbishop of Abuja Province in 2007.
2. Nicholas D. Okoh was the Anglican Archbishop of Bendel Province in 2007.
3. Joseph O. Akinfenwa was the Anglican Archbishop of Ibadan Province in 2007.
4. Benjamin A. Kwashi was the Anglican Archbishop of Jos Province in 2007.
5. Edmund E. Akanya was the Anglican Archbishop of Kaduna Province in 2007.
6. Ephraim Ademowo was the Anglican Archbishop of Lagos Province in 2007.
7. Ugochukwu Uwaoma Ezuoke was the Anglican Archbishop of Niger Delta Province in 2007.
8. Samuel Adedayo Abe was the Anglican Archbishop of Ondo Province in 2007.
9. Bennett C. I. Okoro was the Anglican Archbishop of Owerri Province in 2007.
10. Maxwell S. C. Anikwenwa was the Anglican Archbishop of The Niger Province in 2007.

== Bishops of missions ==
1. Martyn Minns was the Anglican bishop of Church of Nigeria Mission (CANA)
2. Simon Peters Mutum was the Anglican bishop of Church of Nigeria Mission (Nomadic) in 2007.
3. Abiodun Olaoye was the Anglican bishop of Church of Nigeria Mission (Congo) in 2007.

== Bishops of Dioceses ==
1. Samuel Adedayo Abe was the Anglican bishop of Ekiti in Ondo Province in 2007.
2. Tubokosemie Abere was the Anglican bishop of Okrika in Niger Delta Province in 2007.
3. Peter Awelewa Adebiyi was the Anglican bishop of Lagos West in Lagos Province in 2007. He was appointed Bishop of Lagos West in 1999 having been Bishop of Owo from 1993 to 1999.
4. Simeon O. M. Adebola was the Anglican bishop of Yewa in Lagos Province in 2007. He retired in 2014 as Bishop of Yewa and was succeeded by Michael Adebayo Oluwarohunbi.
5. Tunde Adeleye was the Anglican bishop of Calabar in Niger Delta Province in 2007.
6. Ephraim Ademowo was the Anglican bishop of Lagos in Lagos Province in 2007.
7. Timothy Adewole was the Anglican bishop of Jebba in Ibadan Province in 2007.
8. B. J. Adeyemi was the Anglican bishop of Badagry in Lagos Province in 2007.
9. Olusegun Adeyemi was the Anglican bishop of Kwara in Ibadan Province in 2007.
10. Philip Adeyemo was the Anglican bishop of Omu-Aran in Ibadan Province in 2007.
11. Tanimu Samari Aduda was the Anglican bishop of Gwagwalada in Abuja Province in 2007. He is the father of the politician Philips Tanimu Aduda and the civil servant Gabriel Tanimu Aduda.
12. Samuel O. Ajani was the Anglican bishop of Egba West in Lagos Province in 2007.
13. Andrew Ajayi was the Anglican bishop of Ekiti Kwara in Ibadan Province in 2007.
14. Olumuyiwa O. Ajayi was the Anglican bishop of Pankshin in Jos Province in 2007.
15. Jacob A. Ajetunmobi was the Anglican bishop of Ibadan South in Ibadan Province in 2007.
16. Emmanuel B. Ajulo was the Anglican bishop of Okene in Abuja Province in 2007. He retired as Bishop of Okene in 2017.
17. Duke T. Akamisoko was the Anglican bishop of Zonkwa in Abuja Province in 2007.
18. Edmund E. Akanya was the Anglican bishop of Kebbi in Kaduna Province in 2007.
19. John Osemeikhian Akao was the Anglican bishop of Sabongidda-Ora in Bendel Province in 2007. He died on 29 May 2017 shortly before he was due to retire. He has earlier been Professor in the Religious Studies Department at the University of Ibadan.
20. Gabriel Akinbolarin Akinbiyi was the Anglican bishop of Akoko in Ondo Province in 2007.
21. Adebayo D. Akinde was the Anglican bishop of Lagos Mainland in Lagos Province in 2007.
22. Joseph O. Akinfenwa was the Anglican bishop of Ibadan in Ibadan Province in 2007.
23. Peter J. Akinola was the Anglican bishop of Abuja in Abuja Province in 2007.
24. Michael O. Akinyemi was the Anglican bishop of Igbomina in Ibadan Province in 2007.
25. Adolphus Amabebe was the Anglican bishop of Niger Delta West in Niger Delta Province in 2007.
26. Israel A. Amoo was the Anglican bishop of New Bussa in Ibadan Province in 2007.
27. Solomon O. Amusan was the Anglican bishop of Oke-Ogun in Ibadan Province in 2007.
28. Maxwell S. C. Anikwenwa was the Anglican bishop of Awka in the Niger Province in 2007.
29. Johnson Akin Atere was the Anglican bishop of Awori in Lagos Province in 2007.
30. Ezekiel Ayo Awosoga was the Anglican bishop of Ijebu in Lagos Province in 2007.
31. Owen N. Azubuike was the Anglican bishop of Isiala-Ngwa in Niger Delta Province in 2007.
32. Jacob Olajide Babajide was the Anglican bishop of Etsako in Bendel Province in 2007.
33. Simon Bala was the Anglican bishop of Kubwa in Abuja Province in 2007.
34. Jonathan Bamaiyi was the Anglican bishop of Katsina in Kaduna Province in 2007.
35. Cornelius S. S. Bello was the Anglican bishop of Zaria in Kaduna Province in 2007.
36. David K. Bello was the Anglican bishop of Otukpo in Abuja Province in 2007.
37. Edafe Benjamin was the Anglican bishop of Western Izon in Bendel Province in 2007.
38. Samuel C. A. Chukwuka was the Anglican bishop of Isikwuato-Umunneochi in Niger Delta Province in 2007.
39. Emmanuel O Chukwuma was the Anglican bishop of Enugu in the Niger Province in 2007.
40. Geoffrey Chukwunenye was the Anglican bishop of Oru in Owerri Province in 2007.
41. John Garba Danbinta was the Anglican bishop of Gusau in Kaduna Province in 2007.
42. William Diya was the Anglican bishop of Kafanchan in Abuja Province in 2007. He retired in 2011.
43. Christian I. Ebisike was the Anglican bishop of Ngbo in the Niger Province in 2007.
44. Jonathan F. E. Edewor was the Anglican bishop of Oleh in Bendel Province in 2007. He was the pioneer Bishop of Oleh and retired in 2012 aged 70. He died in 2021.
45. Christian O. Efobi was the Anglican bishop of Aguata in the Niger Province in 2007.
46. Emmanuel Egbunu was the Anglican bishop of Lokoja in Abuja Province in 2007.
47. Clement N. Ekpeye was the Anglican bishop of Ahoada in Niger Delta Province in 2007.
48. Blessing Enyindah was the Anglican bishop of Ikwerre in Niger Delta Province in 2007.
49. Samuel K. Eze was the Anglican bishop of Ukwa in Niger Delta Province in 2007.
50. Sosthenes Eze was the Anglican bishop of Enugu North in the Niger Province in 2007.
51. Samuel C. Ezeofor was the Anglican bishop of Ogbaru in the Niger Province in 2007.
52. Joseph C. Ezirim was the Anglican bishop of Aba Ngwa North in Niger Delta Province in 2007.
53. Ugochukwu Uwaoma Ezuoke was the Anglican bishop of Aba in Niger Delta Province in 2007.
54. Michael O. Fape was the Anglican bishop of Remo in Lagos Province in 2007.
55. Jacob Ola Fasipe was the Anglican bishop of Oyo in Ibadan Province in 2007.
56. Nathaniel O. Fasogbon was the Anglican bishop of Oke-Osun in Ibadan Province in 2007. He retired in 2010.
57. Stanley D. Fube was the Anglican bishop of Langtang in Jos Province in 2007.
58. Solomon S. Gberegbara was the Anglican bishop of Ogoni in Niger Delta Province in 2007.
59. Evans J. Ibeagha was the Anglican bishop of Nike in the Niger Province in 2007.
60. Jonah N. Ibrahim was the Anglican bishop of Kontagora in Abuja Province in 2007.
61. Marcus A. Ibrahim was the Anglican bishop of Yola in Jos Province in 2007.
62. Christian Esezi Ide was the Anglican bishop of Warri in Bendel Province in 2007.
63. Josiah A. Idowu-Fearon was the Anglican bishop of Kaduna in Kaduna Province in 2007.
64. Kenneth Ifemene was the Anglican bishop of Ikwo in the Niger Province in 2007.
65. Emmanuel U. Iheagwam was the Anglican bishop of Egbu in Owerri Province in 2007. He was the pioneer Bishop of Egbu from 1996 and was replaced by Geoffrey Okoroafor on his retirement in 2012. He had previously been a lecturer at the University of Nigeria Nsukka; he was elected at Sabongidda-Ora on 28 November 1995, consecrated at the Cathedral Church of All Saints, Wuse, Abuja on 11 February 1996, and enthroned on 15 February 1996.
66. Jonah C. Ilonuba (1938–2018) was the Anglican bishop of Nsukka in the Niger Province in 2007. He died in 2018.
  He was elected the pioneer Bishop of Nsukka in 1994 and was succeeded by Aloysius Agbo in 2008, when Ilonuba became 70.
67. John Imaekhai was the Anglican bishop of Esan in Bendel Province in 2007.
68. Peter Imasuen was the Anglican bishop of Benin in Bendel Province in 2007.
69. Peter Imhona was the Anglican Bishop of Ika in Bendel Province in 2007.
70. Nathan Inyom was the Anglican bishop of Makurdi in Abuja Province in 2007.
71. Michael Ipinmoye was the Anglican bishop of Akure in Ondo Province in 2007. He retired in 2014, and was succeeded as Bishop of Akure by Nathaniel Oladejo Ogundipe.
72. Ignatius C. O. Kattey was the Anglican bishop of Niger Delta North in Niger Delta Province in 2007.
73. Jeremiah N. Kolo was the Anglican bishop of Kutigi in Abuja Province in 2007.
74. Jonah G. Kolo was the Anglican bishop of Bida in Abuja Province in 2007.
75. E. F. Kupolati was the Anglican bishop of Ijumu in Abuja Province in 2007.
76. Solomon G. Kuponu was the Anglican bishop of Ijebu-North in Lagos Province in 2007.
77. Benjamin A. Kwashi was the Anglican bishop of Jos in Jos Province in 2007.
78. Ali Buba Lamido was the Anglican bishop of Wusasa in Kaduna Province in 2007.
79. G. L. Lasebikan was the Anglican bishop of Ondo in Ondo Province in 2007.
80. Yusuf I. Lumu was the Anglican bishop of Dutse in Kaduna Province in 2007.
81. Amos A. Madu was the Anglican bishop of Oji River in the Niger Province in 2007.
82. Caleb Anny Maduoma was the Anglican bishop of Ideato in Owerri Province in 2007.
83. Emmanuel Kanu Mani was the Anglican bishop of Maiduguri in Jos Province in 2007.
84. Miller K. Maza was the Anglican bishop of Lafia in Abuja Province in 2007.
85. Vincent O. Muoghereh was the Anglican bishop of Ughelli in Bendel Province in 2007. He handed over to Cyril Odutemu in 2010.
86. Joseph N. Musa was the Anglican bishop of Idah in Abuja Province in 2007.
87. Henry C. Ndukuba was the Anglican bishop of Gombe in Jos Province in 2007.
88. Anthony O. Nkwoka was the Anglican bishop of Niger West in the Niger Province in 2007. He was succeeded as bishop by Johnson Ekwe in 2015.
89. Ikechi Nwachukwu was the Anglican bishop of Umuahia in Niger Delta Province in 2007.
90. Alfred I. S. Nwaizuzu was the Anglican bishop of Okigwe North (now Isi Mbano) in Owerri Province in 2007.
91. Okechukwu Precious Nwala was the Anglican bishop of Etche in Niger Delta Province in 2007.
92. Isaac Chijioke Nwaobia was the Anglican bishop of Isiala Ngwa-South in Niger Delta Province in 2007.
93. Zakka L. Nyam was the Anglican bishop of Kano in Kaduna Province in 2007.
94. Anga Fred Nyanabo was the pioneer Anglican bishop of Northern Izon in Niger Delta Province in 2007. He died in 2018, aged 70.
95. David F. A. Obiosa was the Anglican bishop of Ndokwa in Bendel Province in 2007.
96. Joseph Akin Odejide was the Anglican bishop of Ifo in Lagos Province in 2007. He retired in 2014, and was succeeded as Bishop of Ifo by Nathaniel Oladejo Ogundipe.
97. Oluranti Odubogun (born 21 March 1946) was the Anglican bishop of Ife in Ibadan Province in 2007. He was consecrated as the second Bishop of Ife in March 2007 and retired in 2016.
98. Olugbenga Olukemi Oduntan was the Anglican bishop of Ajayi Crowther in Ibadan Province in 2007.
99. Bright J. E. Ogu was the Anglican bishop of Mbaise in Owerri Province in 2007.
100. J. Ebunolouwa Ogunele was the Anglican bishop of On the Coast in Lagos Province in 2007.
101. Abiodun O. Ogunyemi was the Anglican bishop of Damaturu in Jos Province in 2007.
102. Raphael Okafor was the Anglican bishop of Ihiala in the Niger Province in 2007.
103. Samuel Oke was the Anglican bishop of Ekiti West in Ondo Province in 2007.
104. Henry S. O. Okeke was the Anglican bishop of Mbamili in the Niger Province in 2007.
105. Ken S. E. Okeke was the Anglican bishop on the Niger in the Niger Province in 2007.
106. Rufus M. Okeremi was the Anglican bishop of Ife East in Ibadan Province in 2007. He retired in 2010.
107. Nicholas D. Okoh was the Anglican bishop of Asaba in Bendel Province in 2007.
108. Bennett C. I. Okoro was the Anglican bishop of Orlu in Owerri Province in 2007.
109. Cyril Chukwunonyerem Okorocha (born 12 June 1948) was the Anglican bishop of Owerri in Owerri Province in 2007. He was the third Bishop of Owerri, consecrated on 13 December 1998 at the Cathedral Church Oshogbo. He is a former Head of Religious Studies, Ahmadu Bello University. He retired as bishop in 2018, aged 70.
110. Godwin Okpala was the Anglican bishop of Nnewi in the Niger Province in 2007.
111. Segun Okubadejo was the Anglican bishop of Ibadan North in Ibadan Province in 2007.
112. James A. Oladunjoye was the Anglican bishop of Owo in Ondo Province in 2007. Oladunjoye was the third Bishop of Owo, taking over from Peter Adebiyi in 2000, and being replaced by Stephen Fagbemi in 2017. He was born in 1948 and holds degrees up to PhD.
113. Samuel Olayanju was the Anglican bishop of Kabba in Ondo Province in 2007. He was consecrated as Bishop of Kabba at St. Cyprian's Church, Port Harcourt on 16 November 2003 and enthroned in 2004.
114. Isaac Olatunde Olubowale was the Anglican bishop of Ekiti Oke in Ondo Province in 2007.
115. Augustine A. Omole was the Anglican bishop of Sokoto in Kaduna Province in 2007.
116. David O. C. Onuoha was the Anglican bishop of Okigwe South in Owerri Province in 2007.
117. Johnson C. Onuoha was the Anglican bishop of Arochukwu/Ohafia in Niger Delta Province in 2007.
118. Chigozirim U. Onyegbule was the Anglican bishop of Ikwuano in Niger Delta Province in 2007.
119. C. B. Onyeibor was the Anglican bishop of Abakaliki in the Niger Province in 2007. He was the pioneer Bishop of Abakaliki in 1997.
120. Chidi C. Oparaojiaku was the Anglican bishop of Ohaji/Egbema in Owerri Province in 2007.
121. Isaac E. Orama (born 6 December 1956) was the Anglican bishop of Uyo in Niger Delta Province in 2007. He died after a long illness in 2014. He was quoted in 2007 as describing homosexuals as "inhuman, insane, satanic and not fit to live", remarks which he denied after the involvement of Rowan Williams, Archbishop of Canterbury. He was enthroned as the Bishop of Uyo on 1 December 2006.
122. James Aye Oruwori was the Anglican bishop of Ogbia in Niger Delta Province in 2007.
123. Matthew Osunade was the Anglican bishop of Ogbomoso in Ibadan Province in 2007.
124. Chijioke B. N. Oti was the Anglican bishop of On the Lake in Owerri Province in 2007.
125. Matthew O. Owadayo (born 1939) was the Anglican bishop of Egba in Lagos Province in 2007. He was born in Ifira-Akoko in 1939 and elected Bishop of Egba in December 1994. He retired in 2009.
126. Jolly Ehigiator Oyekpen was the Anglican bishop of Akoko-Edo in Bendel Province in 2007.
127. Gabriel Herbert Pepple was the Anglican bishop of Niger Delta in Niger Delta Province in 2007.
128. Akintunde A. Popoola was the Anglican bishop of Offa in Ibadan Province in 2007.
129. James Afolabi Popoola was the Anglican bishop of Osun in Ibadan Province in 2007.
130. Olubayu Sowale was the Anglican bishop of Ilesa in Ibadan Province in 2007.
131. Musa Mwin Tula was the Anglican bishop of Bauchi in Jos Province in 2007.
132. Paul A. Udogu was the Anglican bishop of Afikpo in the Niger Province in 2007.
133. Emmanuel A. Ugwu was the Anglican bishop of Awgu-Aninri in the Niger Province in 2007.
134. Timothy Yahaya was the Anglican bishop of Jalingo in Jos Province in 2007.
135. Daniel Yisa was the Anglican bishop of Minna in Abuja Province in 2007.
136. Samuel Zamani was the Anglican bishop of Kwoi in Abuja Province in 2007.
137. Jwan Zhumbes was the Anglican bishop of Bukuru in Jos Province in 2007.
138. Idris Mato Zubairu was the Anglican bishop of Bari in Kaduna Province in 2007.
