= Anglican Province of Owerri =

Anglican province in Nigeria

The Anglican Province of Owerri is one of the 14 ecclesiastical provinces of the Church of Nigeria. It comprises 12 dioceses:

- Okigwe South (Bishop:David Onuoha)
- Owerri (Bishop: Chukwuma Oparah)
- Orlu (Bishop: Benjamin Chinedum Okeke)
- Mbaise (Bishop: Chamberlain Chinedu Ogunedo)
- Isi Mbano (Bishop: Godson Udochukwu Ukanwa)
- Ideato (Bishop: Henry Okeke)
- Egbu (Bishop: Geoffrey Okoroafor)
- Ohaji/Egbema (Bishop: Chidi Collins Oparaojiaku)
- On the Lake (Bishop: Chijioke Oti)
- Oru (Bishop: Geoffrey Chukwunenye)
- Okigwe (Bishop: Edward Osuegbu)
- Ikeduru (Bishop: Emmanuel Maduwike)

== Archbishops of the Province ==
- Bennett Okoro, Bishop of Orlu (re-elected 2007)
- 2020–present: David Onuoha, Bishop of Okigwe
