= Anglican Province of Enugu =

Anglican province in Nigeria

The Anglican Province of Enugu is one of the 14 ecclesiastical provinces of the Church of Nigeria. The province comprises 12 dioceses. The Archbishop of the Province of Enugu is Sosthenes Ikechukwu Eze, who succeeded Emmanuel O. Chukwuma in 2024. Chukwuma was Archbishop since 2014.

The dioceses are:

- Abakaliki (Bishop: Monday Nkwoagu)
- Afikpo (Bishop: Paul Udogu)
- Awgu/Aninri (Bishop: Benson Chukwunweike)
- Eha-Amufu (Bishop: Daniel Olinya)
- Enugu (Bishop: Samuel Ike)
- Enugu North (ArchBishop: Sosthenes Ikechukwu Eze)
- Ikwo (Bishop: Kenneth Ifemene)
- Ngbo (Bishop: Godwin Awoke)
- Nike (Bishop: Christian Onyia)
- Nsukka (Bishop: Aloysius Agbo)
- Oji River (Bishop: Ikechukwu Egbuonu)
- Udi (Bishop: Chjioke Aneke)
