= Uju Obinya =

Anglican bishop in Nigeria

Uju Otoukwesiri Wachukwu Obinya // was an Anglican bishop in Nigeria: he was Bishop of Ukwa, one of nine dioceses within the Anglican Province of Aba, itself one of 14 provinces within the Church of Nigeria.

Obinya was born in 1934 and educated at Trinity Theological College, Umuahia. He was ordained deacon in 1964 and priest in 1965. A former Canon and Archdeacon, he was bishop from 1994 to 2005.

Obinya was consecrated as the pioneer Bishop of Ukwa on 16 January 1994 at St. Michael's Cathedral Aba, a post from which he retired in 2004.
