= Diocese of Minna (Anglican Communion) =

Anglican Diocese in the Church of Nigeria

The Diocese of Minna (Anglican Communion) is one among the 11 dioceses in the Anglican Province of Lokoja in the Church of Nigeria. The current Bishop of Minna diocese is Daniel Yisa.
