= Benson Chukwunweike =

Anglican bishop of Nigeria

Benson Chukwunweike is the Anglican Bishop of Awgu/Aninri of the Church of Nigeria in the Province of Enugu.

He was elected as Bishop of Awgu/Aninri in Jan 2020.
