= Anglican Diocese of Ife East =

Anglican diocese in Nigeria

The Anglican Diocese of Ife East is one of 17 dioceses within the Anglican Province of Ibadan, itself one of 14 ecclesiastical provinces within the Church of Nigeria. The current bishop is the Right Rev. Oluseyi Oyelade.

Ife East Diocese, Anglican Communion, Modakeke, was inaugurated on 28 May 2008 by the Primate of All Nigeria, Peter Jasper Akinola. The first bishop was Rufus Morakinyo Okeremi, who retired in 2010, and was succeeded by Oluseyi Oyelade, elected on 16 April 2010.

Bishops	Years
Rufus Morakinyo Okeremi	2008–2010
Oluseyi Oyelade	2010–
