= Ugochukwu Ezuoke =

Anglican bishop in Nigeria

Ugochukwu Ezuoke // was an Anglican bishop in Nigeria. He was the Archbishop of the Anglican Province of Aba and Bishop of Aba until 2011 when he retired and was succeeded as Archbishop by Ikechi Nwosu.

Ezuoke was consecrated as the pioneer Bishop of Umuahia on 16 January 1994 at St. Michael's Cathedral Aba.
