= Diocese of Kontagora =

Diocese of Kontagora may refer to:

- Anglican Diocese of Kontagora
- Roman Catholic Diocese of Kontagora
