= Diocese of Minna =

Diocese of Minna may refer to:

- Anglican Diocese of Minna
- Roman Catholic Diocese of Minna
