= Diocese of Pankshin =

Diocese of Pankshin may refer to:

- Anglican Diocese of Pankshin
- Roman Catholic Diocese of Pankshin
