= Samuel Adedayo Abe =

Anglican bishop of Nigeria

Samuel Adebayo Abe was the Anglican Bishop of Ekiti in 2007, in Ondo Province of the Church of Nigeria.

Abe retired in 2012 as the Bishop of Ekiti and Archbishop of Ondo Province; he was succeeded as Bishop of Ekiti by Chris Omotunde, and by George Olatunji Lasebikan as Archbishop of Ondo.

He was consecrated Bishop of Ekiti in 1998, upon the retirement of Samuel Akinbola. He was re-elected for a second term as Archbishop of Ondo in 2007.
