= Uzochukwu =

Uzochukwu is a surname. Notable people with the surname include:

- David Uzochukwu (born 1998), Austrian–Nigerian art photographer
- Emmanuel Uzochukwu (born 1998), Nigerian footballer
- Fidelis Uzochukwu Okafor, Nigeriam academic
- Henry Uzochukwu (born 1999), Nigerian footballer
- Izunna Uzochukwu (born 1990), Nigerian footballer
- Obiora Uzochukwu, Nigerian bishop
- Sam Uzochukwu, Nigerian academic
- Timothy Uzochukwu Obi (1946–2022), Nigerian veterinary professor
- Ugonna Uzochukwu, Nigerian footballer
