= Friday John Imaekhai =

Anglican bishop in Nigeria

Friday John Imaekhai was an Anglican archbishop in Nigeria until his retirement in 2020.

Imaekhai was Bishop of Esan from 2000 to 2020 and Archbishop of Bendel from 2010 to 2020.

He was elected as Archbishop of Bendel on 29 October 2009 at the Episcopal synod of the Church of Nigeria Anglican Communion held at the Basilica of Grace Apo in Gudu district of the Anglican Diocese of Abuja.
