= Israel Kelue Okoye =

Anglican bishop in Nigeria

Israel Kelue Okoye is an Anglican bishop in Nigeria: he is the current Bishop of Ihiala, one of nine within the Anglican Province of the Niger, itself one of 14 provinces within the Church of Nigeria.

He was consecrated as a bishop (to serve as Bishop of Ihiala) on 24 July 2016 at Archbishop Vining Memorial Cathedral in Ikeja; prior to his election, he was serving as General Secretary of the Church of Nigeria.
