= Emmaunuel Ugwu =

Anglican bishop in Nigeria

Emmaunuel Ugwu is an Anglican bishop in Nigeria: he is the emeritus Bishop of Awgu/Aninri.
