= Temple Nwaogu =

Anglican bishop in Nigeria

Temple Nwaogu is an Anglican bishop in Nigeria: he is the current Bishop of Isiala-Ngwa, one of nine within the Anglican Province of Aba, itself one of 14 provinces within the Church of Nigeria.
