= Christopher Tayo Omotunde =

Anglican bishop in Nigeria

Christopher Tayo Omotunde is a retired Anglican Archbishop in Nigeria: he is the former Bishop of Ekiti Anglican Diocese and Archbishop of Ondo Province in the Church of Nigeria.

Omotunde succeeded Samuel Adedayo Abe as the Bishop of Ekiti on the latter's retirement in 2012. He succeeded George Olatunji Lasebikan as Archbishop of Ondo in 2019.

He retired on 1 March 2022.
