= Anglican Diocese of Ifo =

Anglican diocese in Nigeria

The Anglican Diocese of Ifo is one of the 13 dioceses within the Anglican Province of Lagos, itself one of the 14 ecclesiastical provinces within the Church of Nigeria. The pioneer bishop, the Right Rev. J. Akin. Odejide retired in October 2012 and the current bishop is the Right Rev. Nathaniel Oladejo Ogundipe. The diocese was created from the Diocese of Egba and inaugurated on 12 March 2007.
