= Maxwell Anikwenwa =

Anglican bishop in Nigeria

Maxwell Anikwenwa // was an Anglican bishop in Nigeria.

Anikwenwa was born in Oyi in 1940; and educated at Dennis Memorial Grammar School in Onitsha and Trinity Theological College, Umuahia.

== Life and career ==
He was ordained deacon in 1964 and priest in December 1966. He served in Onitsha and Freetown. He was elected, consecrated, and enthroned as the first Bishop of Awka in 1987; and Archbishop of the Niger in 2000.

He was also Dean of the Church of Nigeria.

He retired as Bishop of Awka, Archbishop of the Niger and Dean of the Church on 22 November 2010.

== Death ==
He died on Monday, 13 March 2023.
