= Rufus Adepoju =

Anglican bishop in Nigeria (born 1963)

Rufus Ajileye Adepoju (born May 10, 1963) is an Anglican bishop in Nigeria, he was the Bishop of Ekiti West. He served as a priest in the Ekiti diocese before being concentrated as bishop in 2017.
