= Anglican Diocese of Eha-Amufu Missionary =

Anglican diocese in Nigeria

Coordinates: 6°39′N 7°46′E

The Anglican Diocese of Eha-Amufu Missionary is one of 12 dioceses within the Anglican Province of Enugu, itself one of 14 ecclesiastical provinces within the Church of Nigeria. The current bishop is the Right Rev. Daniel Nkemjika Olinya.
