= Steven Akobe =

Anglican bishop in Nigeria

Steven Kadoye Akobe is an Anglican bishop in Nigeria: he is the current Bishop of Kabba, one of 11 dioceses within the Anglican Province of Lokoja, itself one of 14 provinces within the Church of Nigeria. His birthday is on February 16.

He was consecrated a bishop on 12 September 2010 at St Peter's Cathedral, Asaba.
