= Obiora Uzochukwu =

Anglican bishop in Nigeria

Obiora Uzochukwu // is the Anglican Bishop of Mbamili in the Niger Province of the Church of Nigeria.

He was elected as Bishop in January 2021. Uzochukwu, who is from Isulo, Orumba South, Anambra, had previously served at St. John's Anglican Church in Umueze, Anambra West, before becoming Vicar and Canon of St. Faith Church, Onitsha.

He was Archdeacon of All Saints Cathedral, Onitsha, from 2014 until 2021.
