= Ndubuisi Obi =

Anglican bishop in Nigeria

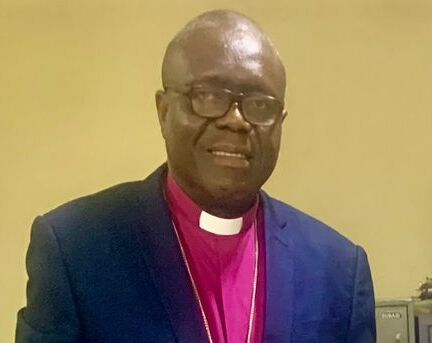
Ndubuisi Obi in 2022

Ndubuisi Obi is an Anglican bishop in Nigeria: since 2019 he has been the Bishop of Nnewi.

He was elected Bishop of Nnewi to succeed Godwin Okpala on 23 August 2019 at St. Peter's Chapel, Ibru International Ecumenical Centre, Agbarha Otor, Delta State.
