= Markus Yohanna Danbinta =

Anglican bishop in Nigeria

Markus Yohanna Danbinta is an Anglican bishop in Nigeria: he is the current Bishop of Dutse, one of ten dioceses within the Anglican Province of Kaduna, itself one of 14 provinces within the Church of Nigeria.
