= David Bello =

Anglican bishop in Nigeria

David Bello is an Anglican bishop in Nigeria: he is the current Bishop of Otukpo one of 13 dioceses within the Anglican Province of Abuja, itself one of 14 provinces within the Church of Nigeria.

He was enthroned as Bishop of Otukpo in 2004.
