= Monday Nkwoagu =

Anglican bishop in Nigeria

Monday Chukwuma Nkwoagu is an Anglican bishop in Nigeria: he is the current Bishop of Abakaliki, one of twelve within the Anglican Province of Enugu, itself one of 14 ecclesiastical provinces within the Church of Nigeria.
