= Samuel Kelechi Eze =

Anglican bishop in Nigeria

Samuel Kelechi Eze is an Anglican bishop in Nigeria: he is the Bishop of Ukwa, one of nine within the Anglican Province of Aba, itself one of 14 provinces within the Church of Nigeria.

Eze was consecrated Bishop of Ukwa on 25 July 2004 at the Cathedral Church of the Advent, Abuja.
