= Prosper Afam Amah =

Anglican bishop in Nigeria

Prosper Afam Amah (born 15 September 1973) is an Anglican bishop in Nigeria: he is the current Bishop of Ogbara, one of nine within the Anglican Province of the Niger, itself one of 14 provinces within the Church of Nigeria.

Amah was born on 15 September 1973 in Uruagu. He is a graduate of Paul University and the University of Nigeria. He reached the post of Archdeacon before consecration, becoming Bishop of Ogbaru in 2018.
