= Anglican Province of Jos =

Anglican province in Nigeria

The Jos Province is one of the 14 ecclesiastical provinces of the Church of Nigeria. It was one of the original ten provinces created in 2002. It is divided into ten dioceses, 31 archdeaconries and 137 parishes.

The ten dioceses of the Jos Province are:

- Bauchi (29 September 1990; Bishop: Musa Mwin Tula; first bishop E. O. Chukuma, consecrated 29 April 1990, Kaduna)
- Bukuru (6 March 2007; Bishop: Jwan Zhumbes)
- Damaturu (8 December 1996; Bishop: Yohannah Audu; erected from Maiduguri diocese; Daniel Abu Visa, first bishop, consecrated 30 November 1996, Oke-Bola)
- Gombe (c. 25 November 1999; Bishop: Cletus Tambari)
- Jalingo (10 December 1996; Bishop: Foreman Nedison; Tanimu Samari, first bishop, consecrated 30 November 1996, Oke-Bola)
- Jos (10 January 1980; Bishop: Ephraim Gongden)
- Langtang (22 May 2008; Bishop: Stanley Fube)
- Maiduguri (28 September 1990; Bishop: Emmanuel Morris; first bishop E. K. Mani, consecrated 29 April 1990, Kaduna)
- Pankshin (6 March 2007; Bishop: Olumuyiwa Ajayi)
- Yola (26 September 1990; Bishop: Markus Ibrahim)

== Archbishops of the Province ==
- 2002–2008: Emmanuel Mani, Bishop of Maiduguri (first archbishop, one term)
- 2008–2017: Benjamin Kwashi, Bishop of Jos
- 2018–2020: Henry Ndukuba (became Primate of All Nigeria)
- 2020–present: Markus Ibrahim, Bishop of Yola
