= Zakka Nyam =

Anglican bishop in Nigeria

Zakka Nyam, consecrated in 1998, is an Anglican bishop in Nigeria: he is the current Bishop of Kano, one of ten dioceses within the Anglican Province of Kaduna, itself one of 14 provinces within the Church of Nigeria.
