= Ephraim Ikeakor =

Anglican bishop in Nigeria

Ephraim Okechukwu Ikeakor // is an Anglican bishop in Nigeria; he is the current Bishop of Amichi, one of nine within the Anglican Province of the Niger, itself one of 14 provinces within the Church of Nigeria.

Ikeakor was born in Umuguma on 4 May 1966. He went to school in Umuchu before graduating from Nnamdi Azikiwe University. He was ordained in 1997. He became a Canon in 1998; and an Archdeacon in 2000. He was elected bishop on 12 November 2008; and consecrated on 11 January 2009.
