= James Oruwori =

Anglican bishop in Nigeria

James Aye Oruwori is the Anglican Bishop of Ogbia in Niger Delta Province of the Church of Nigeria.

Oruwori was Bishop of Ogbia at the first synod of the Diocese at St. Stephen's Anglican Church, Otuoke, Ogbia in 2012, at which President Goodluck Jonathan spoke, and at the Provincial Bishops' Missionary conference held in the Anglican Diocese of Lagos West in 2008.
