= Anglican Diocese of Kaduna =

Anglican diocese in Nigeria

The Anglican Diocese of Kaduna is one of eleven dioceses within the Anglican Province of Kaduna, itself one of 14 ecclesiastical provinces within the Church of Nigeria. The current bishop is the Right Rev. Timothy Yahaya.
