= Anglican Diocese of Ikeduru =

Anglican diocese in Nigeria

The Anglican Diocese of Ikeduru is one of twelve dioceses within the Anglican Province of Owerri, itself one of fourteen ecclesiastical provinces within the Church of Nigeria. It was established in 2009. Its current bishop is the Right Rev. Emmanuel Maduwike.
