= Anglican Diocese of Ogori-Magongo =

Anglican diocese in Nigeria

The Anglican Diocese of Ogori-Magongo is one of eleven within the Anglican Province of Lokoja, itself one of 14 ecclesiastical provinces within the Church of Nigeria.

On 11 January 2009, the Right Rev. Festus Davies was consecrated by the Church of Nigeria at the All Saints Cathedral Church, Ughelli.
