= Augustine Omole =

Anglican bishop of Nigeria

Augustine Omole (1955–April 2021) was an Anglican bishop in Nigeria who served as the Bishop of Sokoto, one of ten dioceses within the Anglican Province of Kaduna, itself one of 14 provinces within the Church of Nigeria.

== Death ==
Omole died in April 2021 at the age of 66 due to injuries from a vehicle accident.
