= Yohannah Audu =

Bishop Anglican Diocese of Damaturu

Yohannah Ahmed Audu is an Anglican bishop in Nigeria: a former Archdeacon he is the current Bishop of Damaturu, one of ten dioceses within the Anglican Province of Jos, itself one of 14 provinces within the Church of Nigeria.

== Notes ==
He was consecrated on 7 May 2017 and enthroned as the 3rd Bishop of the Anglican Diocese of Damaturu on 18 June 2017. He has seven children. Five boys and two girls.
