= Raphael Okafor =

Anglican bishop in Nigeria

Raphael Okafor was an Anglican bishop in Nigeria: he was Bishop of Ihiala from 2008 until his retirement in 2016.

Okafor was born in Zaria on 7 August 1946. He was educated at the CMS school in Awka-Etiti, Emmanuel College, Owerri and Trinity College, Bristol. He worked with the Scripture Union in Nigeria, becoming General Secretary in 1980. He was ordained deacon in 1989, priest in 1990. He served in the Diocese of Enugu, rising to be a Canon and then an Archdeacon.
