= Anglican Province of the Niger =

Anglican province in Nigeria

The Anglican Province of the Niger is one of the 14 ecclesiastical provinces of the Church of Nigeria. It includes nine dioceses:

- Awka (Bishop: Alexander Ibezim)
- Aguata (Bishop: Samuel Ezeofor)
- Amichi (Bishop: Ephraim Ikeakor)
- Ihiala (Bishop: Israel Kelue Okoye)
- Mbamili (Bishop: Obiora Uzochukwu)
- On the Niger (Bishop: Owen Chidozie Nwokolo)
- Niger West (Bishop: Johnson Ekwe)
- Nnewi (Bishop: Ndubuisi Obi)
- Ogbaru (Bishop: Prosper Afam Amah)

== Archbishops of the Province ==
Maxwell Anikwenwa, Bishop of Awka was the first archbishop of the Niger Province, from its erection in 2002 until his retirement in 2010; he had previously been Archbishop of Province II since 2000. He was re-elected in 2007.

Christian Efobi, Bishop of Aguata, was the second Archbishop of the Province, until his retirement in 2018. He had started his second term as archbishop on 24 July 2016.

Godwin Okpala, Bishop of Nnewi, was the third Archbishop, from 4 April 2018 until his retirement in September 2019.

Alexander Chibuzo Ibezim, Bishop of Awka, has been Archbishop of the Province of the Niger since his election during 2019 and installation on 24 September 2019.

== Diocese on the Niger ==
The oldest diocese in the province and in all Nigeria is the Diocese of Niger; ultimately, all the dioceses of the province have split from that on the Niger.

== Diocese of Awka ==
The Diocese of Awka was created on 9 March 1987, from the Diocese on the Niger and inaugurated during a ceremony at the then Pro-Cathedral, St Faith's. The cathedral is St Faith's, Awka; the diocese was split on 5 September 2005, to create the Aguata diocese.

=== Bishops of Awka ===
- 1987 – 2010 (ret.): Maxwell Anikwenwa (also Archbishop, Province II, 2000–2002 and of Niger Province, 2002–2010)
- 2010 – present: Alexander Chibuzo Ibezim (also Archbishop since 2019)

== Diocese of Nnewi ==
Nnewi diocese was split off from the Diocese of the Niger, and inaugurated on 14 February 1996. The cathedral of the diocese is St Mary's, Uruagu Nnewi (formerly a pro-cathedral). The Diocese of Nnewi has since been split twice, to form the Dioceses of Amichi and of Ihiala.

=== Bishops of Nnewi ===
- 1996 – 2019 (ret.): Godwin Okpala (also Archbishop, 2018–2019)
- 2019–present: Ndubuisi Obi (elected 23 August 2019)

== Diocese of Aguata ==
Aguata diocese was erected from that of Awka in 2005; it was inaugurated on 4 September 2005, in a ceremony led by Peter Akinola, Primate of All Nigeria. The mother church of the diocese is St John's Cathedral, Ekwulobia.

=== Bishops of Aguata ===
- 2005 – 2018 (ret.): Christian Efobi (previously Bishop of Yola)
- 2018 – present: Samuel Ezeofor (previously Bishop of Ogbaru, translated 6 February 2018; also Archbishop)

== Diocese of Ogbaru ==
Previously a Missionary Archdeaconry of the Diocese on the Niger, Ogbaru was erected a missionary diocese on 15 March 2007; its headquarters are at Atani, and the cathedral is St James's Cathedral, Atani.

=== Bishops of Ogbaru ===
- 2007 – 2018: Samuel Ezeofor (first bishop; translated to Aguata, 6 February 2018)
- 2018 – present: Prosper Afam Amah

== Diocese of Ihiala ==
On 7 June 2008, Ihiala diocese was inaugurated, having been split from the Diocese of Nnewi. The mother church is St Silas' Cathedral, Ihiala.

=== Bishops of Ihiala ===
- 2008 – 2016 (ret.): Raphael Okafor (aka Ralph or Raph)
- 24 July 2016 – present: Israel Kelue Okoye (consecrated 24 July 2016, at Archbishop Vinning Memorial Church Cathedral, Ikeja)

== Diocese of Niger West ==
The Diocese of Niger West was split from the Diocese on the Niger on 9 June 2008; the mother church is St Gabriel's Cathedral, Umueri.

=== Bishops of Niger West ===
- 2008–2015: Anthony Nkwoka
- 2015–present: Johnson Ekwe

== Diocese of Mbamili ==
Erected from Niger Diocese, Mbamili was inaugurated on 9 June 2008 and Okeke was its first bishop.

=== Bishops of Mbamili ===
- 2008–2020: Henry Okeke (translated to Ideato)
- February 2021 – present: Obiora Uzochukwu)

== Diocese of Amichi ==
The Diocese of Amichi was founded from the Diocese of Nnewi, and inaugurated on 13 January 2009; the mother church is St Andrew's Cathedral, Amichi.

=== Bishops of Amichi ===
- 2009–present: Ephraim Ikeakor
