= Anglican Diocese of Isiala-Ngwa South =

Anglican diocese in Nigeria

Coordinates: 5°15′N 7°18′E

The Anglican Diocese of Isiala-Ngwa South is one of nine dioceses within the Anglican Province of Aba, itself one of 14 ecclesiastical provinces within the Church of Nigeria: founded in 2007, the current bishop is the Rt Rev. Isaac Nwaobia.
