= Anglican Diocese of On the Lake =

Anglican diocese in Nigeria

The Anglican Diocese of On the Lake is one of twelve within the Anglican Province of Owerri, itself one of fourteen ecclesiastical provinces within the Church of Nigeria: the current bishop is the Right Rev. Chijioke Oti.
