= Foreman Nedison =

Anglican bishop in Nigeria

Foreman Nedison is an Anglican bishop in Nigeria: he is the current Bishop of Jalingo, one of ten dioceses within the Anglican Province of Jos, itself one of 14 provinces within the Church of Nigeria.
