= Anglican Diocese of Udi =

Anglican diocese in Nigeria

Coordinates: 6°19′N 7°26′E

The Anglican Diocese of Udi is one of 12 dioceses within the Anglican Province of Enugu, itself one of 14 ecclesiastical provinces within the Church of Nigeria.

The current bishop is the Right Rev. Chjioke Augustine Aneke.
