= Emmanuel Morris =

Anglican bishop in Nigeria

Emmanuel Morris is an Anglican bishop in Nigeria: he is the current Bishop of Maiduguri, one of ten dioceses within the Anglican Province of Jos, itself one of 14 provinces within the Church of Nigeria.

He was consecrated as Bishop of Maiduguri at the Cathedral Church of St. James the Great, Oke-Bola, Ibadan, on 30 July 2017.
