= Edward Osuegbu =

Anglican bishop in Nigeria

Edward Osuegbu (//) is the current Bishop of Okigwe. He was born in 1959 in Imo State. Osuegbu was educated at Trinity Theological College, Umuahia and ordained in 1984. He served as a college chaplain and an archdeacon before his episcopal appointment.
