= Jonah Ibrahim =

Anglican bishop in Nigeria

Jonah Ibrahim is an Anglican bishop in Nigeria: he is the current Bishop of Kontagora, one of 11 dioceses within the Anglican Province of Lokoja, itself one of 14 provinces within the Church of Nigeria.
