= Oluseyi Oyelade =

Anglican bishop in Nigeria

Oluseyi Oyelade is an Anglican bishop in Nigeria: he is the current Bishop of Ife East.

Oyelade was elected on April 16, 2010, having previously been an archdeacon and the incumbent at Our Saviours Church Garki, Abuja.
