= Anglican Diocese of Kutigi =

Anglican diocese in Nigeria

Coordinates: 9°27′N 5°38′E

The Anglican Diocese of Kutigi is one of eleven within the Anglican Province of Lokoja, itself one of 14 ecclesiastical provinces within the Church of Nigeria. The current bishop is the Right Rev. Jeremiah Kolo

The Church Missionary Society began work in Kutigi in 1903 and a year later the first church was built. The first priest, The Rev. J. D. Atkins, arrived in 1906. He was replaced in 1910 by the Rev. A. W. Banfield. By 1912, the Rev. C.H Williams headed the work of Kutigi, reaching out to over 60 villages. In 1921 the foundation stone of the first church was laid. In 1956 this was demolished and replaced during the tenure of the Rev. Daniel Jiya. He was succeeded by Canon Samuel Audu Latiko. In 2013 a new Cathedral was begun.
