= Olumuyiwa Ajayi =

Anglican bishop in Nigeria

Olumuyiwa Ajayi is an Anglican bishop in Nigeria: he is the current Bishop of Pankshin, one of ten dioceses within the Anglican Province of Jos, itself one of 14 provinces within the Church of Nigeria. His Diocese covers three local government areas, Pankshin, Kanke and Kanam.

Olumuyiwa Odejide Ajayi born in Ake, Abeokuta on 2 November 1961, a native of Igan Alade in Yewa North Local Government area of Ogun State Nigeria. He is the pioneer Bishop of Diocese of Pankshin Anglican Communion (Church of Nigeria), he has five children. He was married to Dorcas (now late) but now remarried to Magdalene and together now have Eleven Children. He holds HND (Marketing) Ogun State Polytechnic Abeokuta, (Now Moshood Abiola Polytechnic Abeokuta). He accepts Jesus Christ (Born-again) on Sunday 24 July 1979. Called into the ministry of the Gospel during his National Youth Service Corp (NYSC) in 1985. He holds Bachelor of Divinity (BD) Theological College of Northern Nigeria (TCNN) Bukuru, Master of Art (M.A) Ethics/Philosophy, University of Jos and Doctor of Philosophy (Ph.D.), Ethics/Philosophy, University of Jos, January 2013. He is a Pastor and Evangelist by call.

Ordained Deacon 30 June 1991, ordained Priest 19 July 1992, in the Anglican Diocese of Osun. Consecrated Bishop of Pankshin, Anglican Communion (Church of Nigeria) 4thApril 2007. He now lives in Pankshin Anglican Bishop court.

Diocesan Areas; Pankshin, Kanke and Kanam Local Government Area of Plateau State Nigeria.

Books authoured and co-authoured by Olumuyiwa Odejide Ajayi;

1. Understanding The Gifts Of The Holy Spirit

2. Overcoming The Challenges Of New Age Religious Movements Against Orthodox Christianity

3. Mastering Church Management

4. The Bedrock For Daily Victory

5. Understanding The Holy Communion

6. A Christian Look At The Morality Of Capital Punishment

7. A Thriving Church

8. The Role Of A Pastor's Wife

9. The Tripod Stand Of Effective Ministry

10. Subtle Little Foxes

11. Human Welfare In The Book of Deuteronomy

12. The Christians View of The Morality of Capital Punishment
