= Anglican Province of Niger Delta =

Anglican province in Nigeria

The Anglican Province of Niger Delta is one of the 14 ecclesiastical provinces of the Church of Nigeria. It comprises 18 dioceses. The Archbishop of the Anglican Province of Niger Delta and Bishop of Ikwere is Blessing Enyindah.

It has 18 dioceses (2025):

1. Ahoada (Bishop: Bernard O. Hanson)
2. Calabar (Bishop: Nneoyi Onen)
3. Etche (Bishop: Precious Nwala)
4. Evo (Bishop: Innocent Ordu)
5. Niger Delta (Bishop: Emmanuel Oko Jaja)
6. Ikwerre (Bishop: Blessing Enyindah)
7. Niger Delta West (Bishop: Nixon A. Enekeme)
8. Niger Delta North (Bishop: Wisdom Budu Ihunwo)
9. Northern Izon (Bishop: Funkuro Godrules Ambare)
10. Ogbia (Bishop: Matthew T. Obaze)
11. Ogoni (Bishop: Solomon Gbregbara)
12. Okrika (Bishop: Enoch Atuboyedia)
13. Uyo (Bishop: Kingsley Ogbonda)
14. Eket (Bishop: vacant)
15. Ikom (Bishop: David Michson)
16. Kalabari (Bishop: Boma Peter Briggs)
17. Ogoja (Bishop: Vincent Ifeanyi Akunna)
18. Omoku (Bishop: Ngozi Richard Okpara)

Blessing Enyindah became Archbishop of Niger Delta Province on July 11, 2021.
