= Anglican Diocese of Ideato =

Anglican diocese in Nigeria

Diocese of Ideato

Location
- Country: Nigeria
- Territory: a portion of Imo State
- Ecclesiastical province: Anglican Province of Owerri
- Metropolitan: Archbishop of Owerri
- Coordinates: 5°52′19″N 7°11′22″E

Statistics
- Population: Total: (as of 2016); 618,357
- Parishes: 64
- Churches: 137
- Members: 127,063

Information
- Denomination: Anglican Communion
- Established: July 12, 1999
- Cathedral: Saint Peter's Cathedral in Arondizuogu
- Secular priests: 210

Current leadership
- Bishop: The Right Rev. Henry Okeke
- Archdeacons: 11

Map
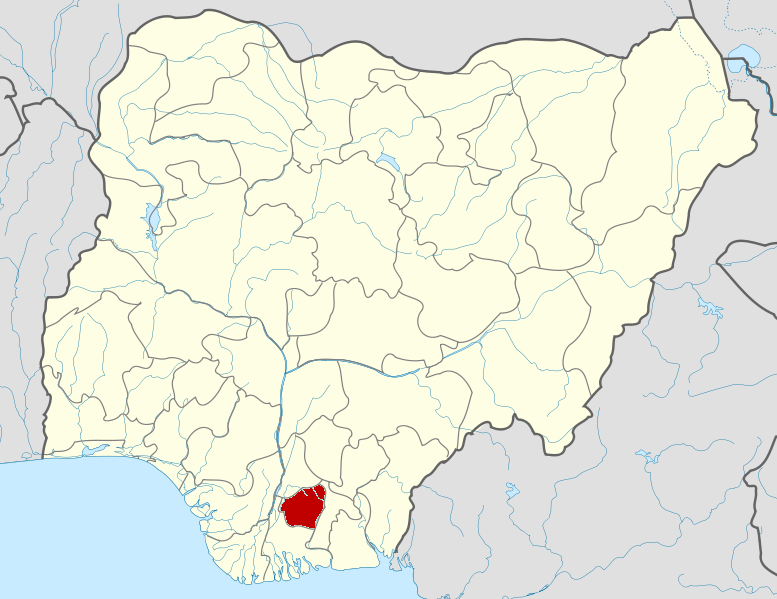
- Ideato North is located in Imo State shown in red.

Website
- www.dioceseofideato.org

The Anglican Diocese of Ideato is one of twelve dioceses within the Anglican Province of Owerri, one of the fourteen ecclesiastical provinces within the Church of Nigeria. The diocese was created out of the then Okigwe-Orlu Diocese in 1999. The current bishop is the Right Rev. Henry Okeke; he was translated from Mbamili in 2020.

== History ==
On 12 July 1999, the Diocese of Ideato was established, marking the return of the headquarters status of St. Peter's Church which was shifted to Nkwerre in 1921.

== Special Churches ==
The Cathedral is St. Peter's Cathedral in Arondizuogu which is the main headquarters of the Anglican Diocese of Ideato.

== Leadership ==
Title	Name	Year
Rt. Rev	Godson Echefu	1999 - 2004
Most. Rev	Caleb Anny Maduoma	2004 - 2020
Rt. Rev	Henry Okeke	2020 -

== See also ==
- Anglicanism
