= Johnson Ekwe =

Anglican bishop in Nigeria

Johnson Ekwe is an Anglican bishop in Nigeria; he is the current Bishop of Niger West, one of nine within the Anglican Province of the Niger, itself one of fourteen provinces within the Church of Nigeria.

He was consecrated Bishop of Niger West in 2015 at All Saints Cathedral Church Onitsha.
