= Anglican Diocese of Egba =

Anglican diocese in Nigeria

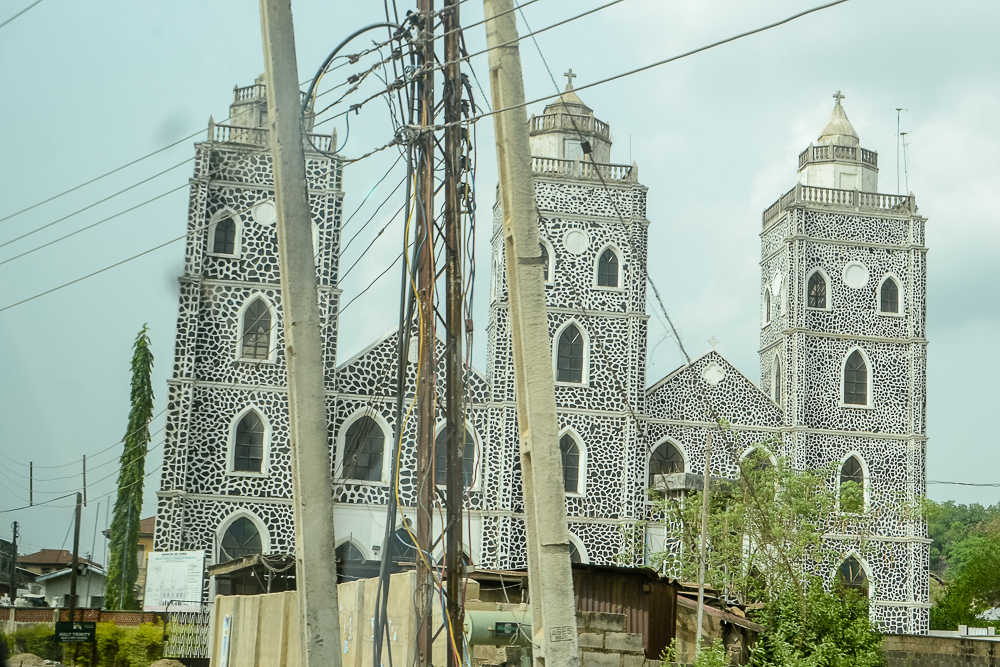

Egba Diocese, Church of Nigeria (Anglican Communion) is one of 13 within the Anglican Province of Lagos, itself one of 14 ecclesiastical provinces within the Church of Nigeria. The current bishop is Emmanuel Adekunle. Jonathan S. Adeniyi was the pioneer Bishop of Egba Diocese when it was created in 1976. On his retirement aged 70 in 1979, he was succeeded by Titus Ilori Akintayo, who served from 1980 until 1994. On his retirement, he was in turn succeeded by Matthew Oluremi Owadayo (1995 – 2009). Adekunle has been the Bishop since 2009.

The Bishop's court of Egba Diocese is located at Old Owode Road, Onikolobo, Ibara, Abeokuta, Ogun State, Nigeria.

The Cathedral is Cathedral Church of St. Peter which is the main headquarters of the Anglican Diocese of Egba, situated in Ake, Abeokuta, Nigeria

Bishop	Years
Jonathan S. Adeniyi	1976–1979
Titus Ilori Akintayo	1980–1994
Matthew Oluremi Owadayo	1994–2009
Emmanuel Adekunle	2009–
