= Stanley Fube =

Anglican bishop in Nigeria

Stanley Fube is an Anglican bishop in Nigeria: he is the current Bishop of Langtang, one of ten dioceses within the Anglican Province of Jos, itself one of 14 provinces within the Church of Nigeria.
