= Ali Buba Lamido =

Anglican bishop of Nigeria

Ali Buba Lamido is an Anglican archbishop in Nigeria.

Lamido is Bishop of Wusasa, and the former Archbishop of Kaduna, former Dean of the Church of Nigeria.
