= Anglican Province of Kaduna =

Anglican province in Nigeria

The Anglican Province of Kaduna is one of the 14 ecclesiastical provinces of the Church of Nigeria. The first archbishop was Josiah Idowu-Fearon, from 2002 to 2008. The current archbishop is Timothy Yahaya, bishop of Kaduna, since 27 August, 2023.

It has 11 dioceses:

- Bari (Bishop: Rt Revd Ramdi Wonole)
- Dutse (Bishop: Markus Yohanna Danbinta; first bishop Yusufu Ibrahim Lumu, consecrated 30 November 1996, Oke-Bola)
- Gusau (Bishop: John Garba Danbinta)
- Ikara (Bishop: Yusuf Janfalan)
- Kaduna (Bishop: Timothy Yahaya)
- Kano (Bishop: Zakka Nyam; founded 8 January 1980 from Kaduna; first bishop Bertram Baima Ayam)
- Katsina (Bishop: Jonathan Bamaiyi; first bishop J. S. Kwasu, consecrated 29 April 1990, Kaduna)
- Kebbi (Bishop: Edmund Akanya; elected from Sokoto diocese; first bishop Edmund Efoyikeye Akanya consecrated 30 November 1996, Oke-Bola)
- Sokoto (Bishop: Augustine Omole)
- Wusasa (Bishop: Ali Buba Lamido)
- Zaria (Bishop: Cornelius Bello)

== Diocese of Kaduna ==
Founded as the Diocese of Northern Nigeria on 30 January 1954, from the Diocese of Lagos. Alfred Smith (A. W. Smith) was previously an assistant bishop of Lagos for the north of that diocese, and therefore forerunner of the Bishops of Northern Nigeria. The name of the diocese was changed to Kaduna diocese after it was split to create Kano and Jos dioceses, 1980.

=== Bishops of Northern Nigeria ===
- 1954–1969 (res.): John Mort (first bishop; consecrated 3 January 1954)
- 1970–1975: Festus Segun (consecrated 5 April 1970, Lagos, and translated to Lagos, 6 February 1975)
- 1975–1980: Titus Eyiolorunsefunmi Ogbonyomi (consecrated 29 June 1975, Lagos)

=== Bishops of Kaduna ===
- 1980–1996 (ret.): Titus Eyiolorunsefunmi Ogbonyomi (name of diocese changed, January 1980; retired 14 December 1996)
