= Emmanuel Chukwuma =

Anglican bishop in Nigeria

Emmanuel Chukwuma // is a former Anglican archbishop in Nigeria. He was appointed the bishop of the Diocese of Enugu, and the archbishop of the Anglican Province of Enugu in 2014.

Chukwuma was born in Asaba on 15 January 1954. After secondary school, he trained to be a teacher. He then graduated in Theology from Immanuel College of Theology, Ibadan. He was ordained in 1981 and served at Christ Church, Ibadan. He has also served as Chaplain to the Archbishop of Nigeria, Timothy Olufosoye, the first Primate of the Church of Nigeria; Vicar of St. Paul, Ibadan; and as Bishop of Bauchi.

He was elected as Archbishop of Enugu at the 11th General Synod of the Church of Nigeria, held at the Cathedral Church of the Good Shepherd, Enugu, in September 2014. He retired in 2024.
