= Christian Efobi =

Anglican bishop in Nigeria

Christian Efobi is an Anglican bishop in Nigeria.

Efobi was born in Kaduna in 1948. He was educated at Anglican Boys Grammar School, Akwukwu-Igbo; New Bethel College Onitsha and The Theological College of Northern Nigeria, Bukuru. He was ordained Deacon in July 1977 and Priest in December 1977. He served in Lafia.Bukuru and Yola. he became Archdeacon of Yola in 1988 and Bishop of Yola in 1990. He was translated to be the inaugural Bishop of Aguata in 2005. Efobi retired in 2018. He became the second Archbishop of Niger.
