= Anglican Diocese of Ohaji/Egbema =

Anglican diocese in Nigeria

The Anglican Diocese of Ohaji/Egbema is one of twelve dioceses within the Anglican Province of Owerri, itself one of fourteen ecclesiastical provinces within the Church of Nigeria: the current bishop is the Right Rev. Chidi Collins Oparaojiaku. Oparaojiaku was consecrated a bishop on May 14, 2008 at St James's Cathedral, Oke-Bola, Ibadan; the missionary diocese was inaugurated on June 6 at St Peter's Cathedral, Umuokanne-Ohaji, Imo State.
