= Anglican Diocese of Ukwa =

Anglican diocese in Nigeria

Coordinates: 4°53′14″N 7°21′26″E

The Anglican Diocese of Ukwa is one of nine dioceses within the Anglican Province of Aba. It is one of 14 ecclesiastical provinces within the Church of Nigeria. The inaugural bishop was Uju Obinya and the current bishop is Manasses Chijiokem Okere.
