= Anglican Diocese of Okigwe =

Anglican diocese in Nigeria

The Anglican Diocese of Okigwe is one of twelve dioceses within the Anglican Province of Owerri, itself one of fourteen ecclesiastical provinces within the Church of Nigeria. The current bishop is the Right Rev. John Obinali.
