= Gabriel Aduda =

Nigerian civil servant

Ambassador Gabriel Aduda
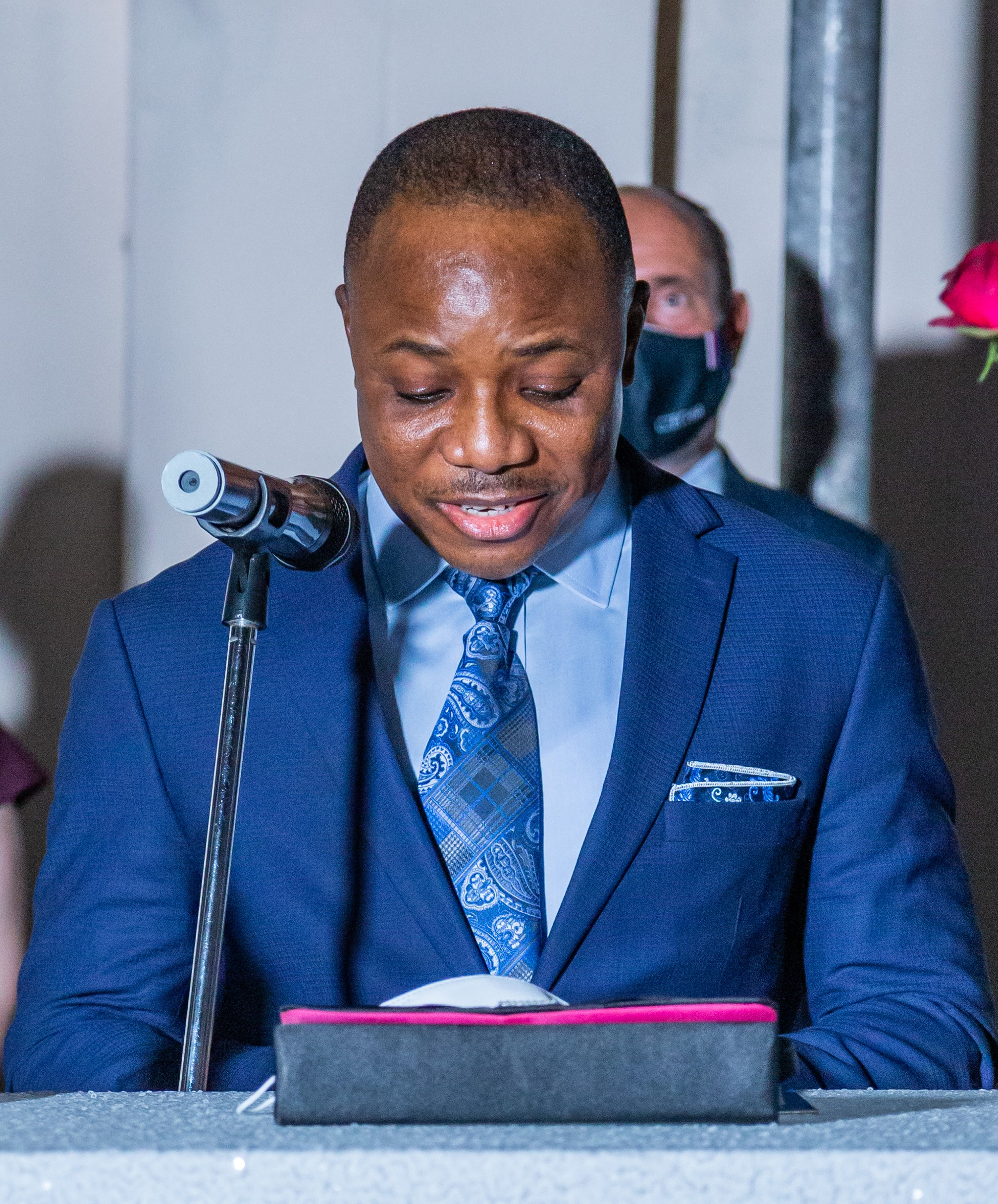
- Aduda speaking in 2021

Permanent Secretary, Federal Ministry of Defence
- Incumbent
- Assumed office January 2025
- President: Bola Tinubu
- Minister: Mohammed Badaru Abubakar

Personal details
- Born: Gabriel Tanimu Aduda; 25 October 1971 (age 54) Abuja, Federal Capital Territory, Nigeria
- Spouse: Mary Aduda
- Children: 3
- Education: PGC - University of Hong Kong; MURP - University of Ibadan; BSc- University of Jos
- Occupation: Civil Servant

Gabriel Tanimu Aduda (born 25 October 1971) is a Nigerian civil servant who serves as the Permanent Secretary of the Federal Ministry of Defence. He previously held the same position at the Federal Ministry of Petroleum Resources, where he played a crucial role in overseeing the operations and policies of the ministry. Aduda also served as OPEC Governor for Nigeria, representing the country's interests in the 186th Ordinary Meeting of the OPEC Conference of Ministers.

In 2021, Aduda was appointed Permanent Secretary of the Federal Ministry of Foreign Affairs. Before this, he served as Permanent Secretary in the Ministry of Youth and Sports and was redeployed to the Ministry of Foreign Affairs in December 2020. Prior to becoming a permanent secretary, he held roles such as Director of Economic Research and Policy Management at the Federal Ministry of Finance and Head of Strategy and Reorientation at the Economic and Financial Crimes Commission.

== Early life and education ==
Aduda holds a BSc. in Geography and Planning from the University of Jos, a Master’s Degree in Urban and Regional Planning from the University of Ibadan (1998), and a Postgraduate Certificate in Corruption Studies from the University of Hong Kong (2012). He has also attended training courses, for example the "Improving Governance and Economic Development in Africa" at the World Bank Institute in Freetown, Sierra Leone.

== Career ==
Aduda has held numerous significant positions throughout his career in the Nigerian Civil Service, which includes:

- Permanent Secretary, Federal Ministry of Petroleum Resources
- Permanent Secretary, Nigerian Federal Ministry of Foreign Affairs (MFA)
- Permanent Secretary, Nigerian Ministry of Youth and Sports
- Permanent Secretary, Political and Economic Affairs Office, Office of the Secretary to the Government of the Federation (OSGF)
- Chairman, National Authority on Chemical & Biological Weapons Convention (NAC&BWC), Office of the Secretary to the Government of the Federation (OSGF)
- Director, Civil Service Transformation, Office of the Head of the Civil Service of the Federation
- Director, Economic Research and Policy Management, Federal Ministry of Finance
- Head of Strategy and Reorientation, Economic and Financial Crimes Commission (EFCC)
- Special Assistant on Special Projects & Millennium Development Goals (MDGs) to the Minister of the Federal Capital Territory Administration (FCTA)
- Head of Governance Research and Consulting, Integriry Organization
- Commissioner (Executive Member), Independent Corrupt Practices Commission (ICPC)

== Controversy ==
In 2017, a report by Sahara Reporters, Premium Times and some media outlets suggested that the Vice President Yemi Osinbajo may have appointed an unqualified person as a permanent secretary. This led to calls for his dismissal from the position. The Coalition For F.C.T Indigenous Groups Association under Kamal Adamu Shaibu criticized these reports, as he claimed the controversial reports published in Premium Times, Sahara Reporters and other media outlets were sponsored by people who fruitlessly fought against the promotion of Aduda to the position of a Director in the Federal Civil Service.
