= Anglican Diocese of Ogbia =

Anglican diocese in Nigeria

The Anglican Diocese of Ogbia is one of ten dioceses within the Anglican Province of the Niger Delta, itself one of 14 ecclesiastical provinces within the Church of Nigeria.

The diocese was created in 2008. The Right Rev. James Oruwori is the incumbent bishop.
