= Alexander Chibuzo Ibezim =

Nigerian Anglican bishop (born 1962)

- Archbishop of Niger; Bishop of Awka
- Church: Church of Nigeria (Anglican Communion)
- Archdiocese: Ecclesiastical Province of the Niger
- Diocese: Diocese of Awka
- Appointed: Archbishop: 24 September 2019

Orders
- Ordination: 1994
- Consecration: 12 September 2010

Personal details
- Born: August 5, 1962 (age 64) Nibo-Nise, Nigeria
- Residence: Awka, Anambra State
- Spouse: Martha Chioma Ibezim
- Education: University of Nigeria

Alexander Chibuzo Ibezim // (born 5 August 1962) is a Nigerian Anglican bishop.

== Biography ==
Ibezim born on 5 August 1962 in Nibo-Nise and was educated at the University of Nigeria. He was ordained in 1994. he served in Lagos, rising to be an Archdeacon. In 2010, he became Bishop of Awka; and in 2020 Archbishop of Niger.

Ibezim was consecrated a bishop on 12 September 2010 at St Peter's Cathedral, Asaba and installed there as Bishop of Awka on 22 November 2010; he was later (additionally) elected Archbishop in 2019 and installed on 24 September 2019.
