= Musa Mwin Tula =

Anglican bishop in Nigeria

Musa Mwin Tula is an Anglican bishop in Nigeria: he is the current Bishop of Bauchi, one of ten dioceses within the Anglican Province of Jos, itself one of 14 provinces within the Church of Nigeria.

He was elected Bishop of Bauchi during the Episcopal Synod on 28 June 2006, at All Saints Church, Wuse, Abuja.
