= Samuel Ezeofor =

Anglican bishop in Nigeria

Samuel Chukwudi Ezeofor (born 8 May 1967) is an Anglican bishop in Nigeria. As of 2018 he is the Bishop of Aguata, one of nine within the Anglican Province of the Niger, which is, itself, one of 14 provinces within the Church of Nigeria. He was Bishop of Ogbaru until 2018.

Ezeofor was born in Onitsha on 8 May 1967. He was educated at Central School Oko, Aguata High School and the University of Nigeria.
