= John Garba Danbinta =

Anglican bishop in Nigeria

John Garba Danbinta is an Anglican bishop in Nigeria: he is the Bishop of Gusau, one of ten dioceses within the Anglican Province of Kaduna, itself one of 14 provinces within the Church of Nigeria.

He was elected Bishop of Gusau in 2005.
