= Isaac Nwaobia =

Anglican bishop in Nigeria

Isaac Nwaobia // is an Anglican bishop in Nigeria: he is the current Archbishop of Aba and Bishop of Isiala-Ngwa South one of nine within the Anglican Province of Aba, itself one of 14 provinces within the Church of Nigeria.

Nwaobia was born in Isiala Ngwa South on 10 November 1962 and educated at Anglican Grammar School, Mbawsi; Trinity Theological College, Umuahia; the University of Calabar; and the University of Ibadan. He was ordained deacon in 1988; priest in 1989; and bishop in 2007; and archbishop in 2019.
