= Anglican Diocese of Esan =

Anglican diocese in Nigeria

Coordinates: 6°45′00″N 6°03′20″E

The Anglican Diocese of Esan is one of twelve within the Anglican Province of Bendel, itself one of fourteen ecclesiastical provinces within the Church of Nigeria. Its bishop from 2000 to 2020, Friday John Imaekhai, was also Archbishop of the Province from 2010 to 2020. The current bishop is Gabriel Elabor; he was consecrated a bishop on 21 September 2020 at the Cathedral Church of the Advent, Abuja.
