= Anglican Diocese of Egbu =

Anglican diocese in Nigeria

The Anglican Diocese of Egbu is one of twelve within the Anglican Province of Owerri, itself one of fourteen ecclesiastical provinces within the Church of Nigeria: the current bishop is the Right Rev. Geoffrey Enyinnaya Okorafor.
