= Jwan Zhumbes =

Anglican bishop in Nigeria

Jwan B N Zhumbes is an Anglican bishop in Nigeria: he is the current Bishop of Bukuru, one of ten dioceses within the Anglican Province of Jos, itself one of 14 provinces within the Church of Nigeria.

Zhumbes is an avid writer. He lives in Jos-South and is married to Lois: they have four children. Currently, Zhumbes is also the Chair of Langham Nigeria Expository Preaching Initiative for Central Nigeria.
