= Anglican Diocese of Ogoni =

Anglican diocese in Nigeria

The Anglican Diocese of Ogoni is one of ten within the Anglican Province of the Niger Delta, itself one of 14 ecclesiastical provinces within the Church of Nigeria. The current bishop is the Right Rev. Solomon Gberegbara. Gberegbara was consecrated a bishop on March 13, 2005 at the Cathedral Church of the Advent, Abuja; and the missionary diocese was inaugurated on March 16 at All Saints' Cathedral, Bori.
