= Paul Olarewaju Ojo =

Anglican bishop in Nigeria

Paul Olarewaju Ojo is an Anglican bishop in Nigeria: a former Archdeacon, since 2018 he has been the Bishop of Ijumu, one of seventeen dioceses within the Anglican Province of Abuja, itself one of 14 provinces within the Church of Nigeria.
