= Henry Okeke =

Anglican bishop in Nigeria

Henry Okeke is an Anglican Bishop in Nigeria.

He is the current Bishop of Ideato, one of 12 within the Anglican Province of Owerri, itself one of 14 provinces within the Church of Nigeria.

Okeke was Bishop of Mbamili until 2020.
