= Edmund Akanya =

Anglican bishop in Nigeria

Edmund Akanya is an Anglican bishop in Nigeria: formerly the Archbishop of Kaduna, he is the current Bishop of Kebbi.

He was elected Archbishop of Kaduna Province for a second term on 19 January 2013.
