= Godwin Okpala =

Anglican bishop in Nigeria

Godwin Izundu Nmezinwa Okpala is an Anglican bishop in Nigeria.

Okpala was Bishop of Nnewi and Archbishop of the Niger Province from 2018, retiring from both posts in 2019.

He was the first Bishop of Nnewi, consecrated in 1996 at All Saints Cathedral, Abuja. He had previously been Archdeacon of Nnewi for Nnewi Diocese; he was elected at Sabongidda-Ora on 28 November 1995 for the Diocese of Nnewi, consecrated at the Cathedral Church of All Saints, Wuse, Abuja on 11 February 1996, and enthroned on 14 February 1996 at St Mary's Pro-Cathedral, Uruagu Nnewi.

On 6 December 2024, Okpala and his driver went missing on the way to Umuchu for a funeral. They were driving through an area where there have been attacks on travelers and kidnappings. He is believed to have been abducted, but later resurfaced.
