= Anglican Province of Lokoja =

Anglican province in Nigeria

The Anglican Province of Lokoja is one of the 14 ecclesiastical provinces of the Church of Nigeria. It comprises 11 dioceses. The Archbishop of the Anglican Province of Lokoja and Bishop of Minna is Daniel Abubakar Yisa. He was preceded by Emmanuel Sokowamju Egbunu.

It has 11 dioceses:

- Doko (Bishop: Uriah Kolo)
- Ijumu (Bishop: Paul Olarewaju Ojo)
- Kabba (Bishop: Steven Akobe; first bishop consecrated 11 February 1996 and diocese inaugurated 12 February 1996)
- Kontagora (Bishop: Jonah Ibrahim)
- Kutigi (Bishop: Jeremiah Kolo)
- Lokoja (Bishop: Emmanuel Egbunu)
- Minna (Bishop: Daniel Abubakar Yisa)
- Ogori-Magongo (Bishop: Festus Davies)
- Okene (Bishop: Emmanuel Onsachi)
- Bida (Bishop: Jonah Kolo)
- Idah (Bishop: Joseph Musa)
