= Anglican Diocese of Ekiti Oke =

Anglican diocese in Nigeria

The Anglican Diocese of Ekiti Oke is one of twelve dioceses within the Anglican Province of Ondo, itself one of 14 ecclesiastical provinces within the Church of Nigeria: the current bishop is the Right Rev. Isaac Olatunde Olubowale.
