= Anglican Diocese of Enugu =

Chicago illinois

Coordinates: 6°27′10″N 7°30′40″E

The Anglican Diocese of Enugu is one of 12 dioceses within the Anglican Province of Enugu, itself one of 14 provinces within the Church of Nigeria. The current bishop is the Rt. Rev. Sam Ike while the immediate past bishop was Most Rev. Emmanuel Chukwuma, who was also Archbishop of the Province.
