= Anglican Diocese of Minna =

Anglican diocese in Nigeria

The Anglican Diocese of Minna is one of eleven within the Anglican Province of Lokoja, itself one of 14 ecclesiastical provinces within the Church of Nigeria. The current bishop is Daniel Abubakar Yisa who is also Archbishop of the Province.

The Diocese of Minna was inaugurated on 3 September 1990, with its first bishop James A. Yisa (who had been consecrated on 29 April 1990 at St Michael's Cathedral, Kaduna). The second bishop was Nathaniel Yisa, who served from 1992 until 2005.
