= Solomon Kuponu =

Anglican bishop in Nigeria

Solomon Kuponu is an Anglican bishop in Nigeria: who is the current bishop of Ijebu-North, following Ezekiel Ayo Awosoga.

Kuponu was born in Badagry, was ordained in Lagos in September 1983, and consecrated bishop on September 11, 2005.
