= Aloysius Agbo =

Anglican bishop of Nigeria

Aloysius Eze Agbo
- Bishop of the Anglican Diocese of Nsukka
- Installed: 26 March 2008

Personal details
- Born: Aloysius Eze Agbo; 15 September 1967 (age 58) Akpani, Isi‑Uzo LGA, Enugu State, Nigeria
- Spouse: Ifeoma Agbo
- Children: Gift, Marvelous
- Occupation: Anglican bishop, theologian

Aloysius Eze Agbo is an Anglican bishop in Nigeria: he is the current Bishop of Nsukka.

Agbo was born on 15 September 1967 in Akpani, Enugu State. He was educated at Trinity Theological College, Umuahia and the University of Nigeria. He was ordained deacon in 2000, and priest in 2001. He was the Archdeacon of Enugu-Ezike until his election as bishop in 2008. He is also a Justice of the Peace of Enugu State.
