= Anglican Diocese of Jos =

Diocese of the Anglican Church of Nigeria

Diocese of Jos

Location
- Ecclesiastical province: Church of Nigeria
- Archdeaconries: 8

Information
- Rite: Anglican
- Cathedral: St Luke's Cathedral, Jos

Current leadership
- Bishop: Ephraim Gongden

Website
- Anglican Diocese of Jos Website

The Anglican Diocese of Jos is a diocese of the Anglican Church of Nigeria which is roughly contiguous with Plateau State.

In the late 1970s, it was recognised that the large Northern Diocese required subdivision as the church was experiencing dramatic growth. It was therefore decided to divide the diocese into three, centred on the existing cathedral in Kaduna and new cathedrals in Jos and Kano. Jos Diocese was founded on 10 January 1980 with the enthronement of Samuel Ebo. The new cathedral was the existing church of St Luke's in the city centre. The diocese was structured with three archdeaconries, which divided the diocese into the three parts:

- Jos, which had responsibility for churches in Plateau State
- Makurdi, which had responsibility for churches in Benue State and
- Yola, which had responsibility for church in Gongola State

The church continued to grow under Ebo and his successor, Timothy Adesola, and, in September 1990, the diocese was further subdivided into three, with new missionary dioceses at Makurdi and Yola, and became part of Province 3 when the Church of Nigeria was divided on 20 September 1990. Subsequently, the diocese has become part of the Province of Jos.

The diocese has a long tradition of involvement with education. As well as founding and supporting a large number of schools, it has strong connections with TCNN and St. Francis of Assisi Theological College, Wusasa.

== Bishops of Jos ==
- 1980–?: Samuel Chukuma Nwokorie Ebo Samuel Ebo (first bishop; consecrated 6 January 1980)
- 1992–2023: Benjamin Kwashi (archbishop of Jos, 2008–2017)
- 2024–present: Ephraim Gongden
