= Benjamin Kwashi =

Anglican bishop of Nigeria (born 1955)

The Most Reverend Benjamin Kwashi OON
- Archbishop of Jos
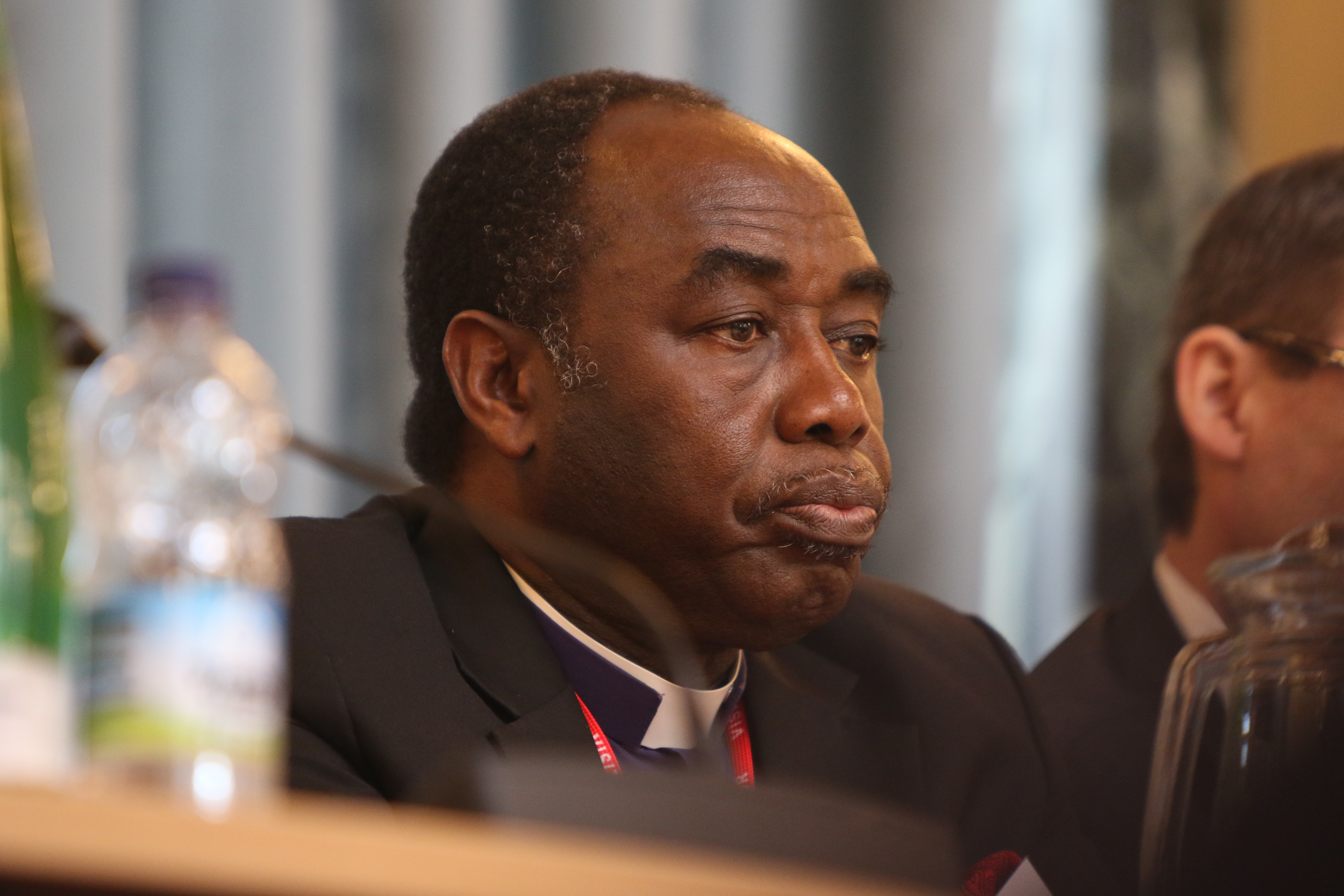
- Church: Church of Nigeria
- Province: Jos
- Diocese: Jos
- In office: 2008–2017
- Predecessor: Emmanuel Kana Mani
- Successor: Henry Ndukuba
- Other posts: Bishop of Jos (1992–2023); General Secretary of GAFCON (2019–2023); Area Bishop for Chad, Diocese of North Africa (2026–present)

Orders
- Ordination: 1982
- Consecration: 1992 by J. Abiodun Adetiloye

Personal details
- Born: September 1955 (age 71) Amper, Kanke, Plateau State, Nigeria
- Denomination: Anglican
- Spouse: Gloria (m. 1983)
- Children: 6
- Education: Trinity Episcopal School for Ministry (DMin), Nashotah House Theological Seminary (DD)

Benjamin Argak Kwashi OON (born Plateau State, 1955) is a Nigerian Anglican archbishop. He is married to Gloria and they have six children, one of them is also a priest. They have 54 orphans living with them in Jos, Northern Nigeria.

== Biography ==
He was born in Amper village in Plateau State, in a Christian family. His father was a respected teacher.

Kwashi at first wanted to follow a military career but he felt a religious calling in 1976, and decided to follow a religious life. He was ordained an Anglican priest in 1982. He went to serve in several rural and urban parishes. He also would be Rector of a Theological College. In 1987, his church and vicariate were totally burned during Muslim riots. He was consecrated as the first bishop of the newly created Anglican Diocese of Jos in 1992. In 2003, the Federal Republic of Nigeria conferred on him the national honor as an Officer of the Order of the Niger (OON), the second-highest civilian honor bestowed in Nigeria. In 2008, he was enthroned as Archbishop of Jos Province in the Church of Nigeria; he was re-elected for a second term on 19 January 2013.

He has been a leading name in the Anglican realignment, attending GAFCON II, held in Nairobi, Kenya, in 21–26 October 2013.

In November 2014, after a bombing in Potiskum killed forty Muslim schoolchildren, Kwashi released a statement strongly criticizing the idea that Boko Haram violence was the result of poverty. Kwashi said it was important that the issues of poverty, corruption, and extremist violence should not be conflated and confused.

At the conclusion of GAFCON 3 on 22 June 2018 in Jerusalem, it was announced that in early 2019 Archbishop Kwashi will succeed Archbishop Peter Jensen, former archbishop of Sydney, as GAFCON's general secretary.

Kwashi earned his Doctor of Ministry degree from Trinity Episcopal School for Ministry in 2002. He was awarded the Doctor of Divinity degree honoris causa from Nashotah House Theological Seminary in 2004. He published Evangelism and Mission (2018) and Neither Bomb nor Bullet (2019), co-written with Andrew Boyd.

In 2023, Kwashi retired as bishop of Jos and general secretary of Gafcon. In 2026, after Chad banned Americans from entering, Kwashi was appointed area bishop for Chad in the Anglican Province of Alexandria's Diocese of North Africa, whose American bishop Ashley Null was unable to minister there.

== Styles ==
- The Reverend Benjamin Kwashi (1982–1992)
- The Right Reverend Benjamin Kwashi (1992–2002)
- The Right Reverend Doctor Benjamin Kwashi (2002–2003)
- The Right Reverend Doctor Benjamin Kwashi OON (2003–2008)
- The Most Reverend Doctor Benjamin Kwashi OON (2008–present)

Anglican Communion titles
Preceded by Timothy Adesola	Bishop of Jos; 1992–2023	Succeeded by Ephraim Gongden
Preceded by Emmanuel Kana Mani	Archbishop of Jos; 2008–2017	Succeeded by Henry Ndukuba
Preceded by Peter Jensen	General Secretary of GAFCON; 2018–2023	Succeeded by Paul Donison
