= Nathaniel Oladejo Ogundipe =

Anglican bishop in Nigeria

Nathaniel Oladejo Ogundipe is an Anglican bishop in Nigeria: he is the current Bishop of Ifo.
