= Michael Adebayo Oluwarohunbi =

Anglican bishop in Nigeria

Michael Adebayo Oluwarohunbi is an Anglican bishop in Nigeria.

Oluwarohunbi was educated at the University of Ilorin. He worked for the Department of Engineering in Abuja before his call to ministry. He was the Supervising Priest of the Cathedral Church of Abuja and General Secretary of the Church of Nigeria Anglican Communion before in 2014 he became Bishop of Yewa.
