= Godwin Awoke =

Anglican bishop in Nigeria

Godwin Awoke is an Anglican bishop in Nigeria: he has been Bishop of Ngbo since 2018.
