= Johnson Akin Atere =

Anglican bishop in Nigeria

- Born: February 15, 1956 (age 69)
- Education: Lagos State University
- Occupation: Teacher

Johnson Akin Atere is an Anglican bishop in Nigeria, he is the current Bishop of Awori.

Akin Atere was born in 1956 in Akoko South-West, Ondo State. He trained then worked as a teacher before entering Immanuel College of Theology, Ibadan in 1985. He was ordained in 1988. He served at Lagos, Ilasamaja and Sango-Ota and Surulere. He was preferred canon in 1999, and archdeacon in 2002. He was senior lecturer in Old Testament studies at the Archbishop Vining College of Theology until his consecration on 12 January 2009. He has a Ph.D. from Lagos State University.
