= Godson Udochukwu Ukanwa =

Anglican bishop in Nigeria

Godson Udochukwu Ukanwa is an Anglican bishop in Nigeria.

Ukanwa is the current Bishop of Isi Mbano.
