= Anglican Diocese of Awgu/Aninri =

Church of Nigeria ecclesiastical jurisdiction

The Anglican Diocese of Awgu/Aninri is one of the 12 dioceses in the ecclesiastical province of Enugu in the Church of Nigeria (Anglican Communion).

== History ==
The diocese was conceived as a part of the campaign of evangelism that was launched during the tenure of Peter Jasper Akinola as Primate of the Church of Nigeria in 2000. The primary aim of this evangelism was to make the Anglican Church more relevant. The time allocation was "within three years". To meet this target, the Church decided on the creation of more missionary Dioceses.

Emmanuel Olisa Chukwuma (OON), who succeeded the former bishop of Enugu Diocese, G.N. Otubelu (OFR) decided to join in mass evangelization. On 31 March 2004 at Holy Trinity Church, 9th Mile Corner Ngwo, committed to create 3 missionary dioceses out of Enugu Diocese, (Ngwo, Awgu, and Nkanu), respectively.

The elders of the churches, including Sir Jonathan Onyama, Igwe Michael Egwuonwu (Ogbo Oha I of Ogboli Awgu), Sir Emma Uchenwa, Sir D.O. Nwobodo, Sir Stephen Okeke, Sir Samuel Chukwu, Sir Emma Chukwu, and others were part of the application. They wrote it to create Awgu/Aninri Missionary Diocese, which was forwarded to the Bishop of Enugu, E.O. Chukwuma, on 9 August 2005 for transmission to the Primate of the Church of Nigeria.

=== Establishment ===
On 4 March 2007, Emmanuel Afam Ugwu was consecrated, after his election as the bishop of the new diocese. The consecration service took place at the Cathedral Church of Advent, Gwarinpa Abuja, led by the Primate of the Church of Nigeria.

Emmanuel Afam Ugwu was enthroned on 16 March 2007 at the Cathedral Church of St. Mark, Isu-Awaa as the pioneer Bishop of the new Anglican Missionary Diocese of Awgu/Aninri. He started planting missions and churches with a team of medical doctors led by Gideon Ilechukwu, and this led to the over 40 new churches, over three years, in the hinterlands of the Diocese.

The Diocese became a fully-fledged Anglican Diocese of Awgu/Aninri after bearing the name "Missionary Diocese" for three years.

=== Recent history ===
Bishop Ugwu retired on 8 March 2020 upon reaching the mandatory age of retirement. On 9 January 2020, Canon Benson Ndubuisi Chukwunweike was elected the second Bishop of the Diocese at the episcopal retreat in Agbara-Otor. Benson Chukwunweike was subsequently consecrated on 20 March 2020 at Holy Trinity Cathedral, Lokoja, Kogi State, in a service led by the Primate of the Church of Nigeria, Nicholas D. Okoh.

Benson Ndubuisi Chukwunweike was enthroned on 3 April 2020 at the Cathedral Church of St. Mark, Isu-Awaa as the second bishop of the Anglican Diocese of Awgu/Aninri.

== Administration ==
Anglican Diocese of Wage/Animi started with three Archdeaconries (Awgu North, Awgu South, and Aninri), and made up of eight Parishes (Cathedral Church of St. Mark, Isu-Awaa; St. Paul's Parish, Awgu; Emmanuel Parish Nenwe; Emmanuel Parish, Ugbo; St. Philip's Parish, Mmaku; St. Mark's Parish, Awgu; Holy Spirit Parish, Agbogugu; and St. Paul's Parish, Odom).

== Bibliography ==
- Church of Nigeria, Anglican Communion. "Website". Official Website of Church of Nigeria (Anglican Communion).
- Diocese of Awgu/Aninri, Anglican Communion. "Website". Official website of Anglican Diocese of Awgu/Aninri.
