= Timothy Yahaya =

Anglican bishop in Nigeria

Timothy Yahaya (born 1967) is an Anglican bishop in Nigeria: formerly the Bishop of Jalingo he is the current Bishop of Kaduna, one of ten dioceses within the Anglican Province of Kaduna, itself one of 14 provinces within the Church of Nigeria. He was installed as the Archbishop of the Anglican province of Kaduna on the 27th of August, 2023.
