= Emmanuel Maduwike =

Anglican bishop in Nigeria

Emmanuel Maduwike is an Anglican bishop in Nigeria.

Maduwike was consecrated the Bishop of Ikeduru on the 14 July 2009 at St. Mathew's Cathedral.
