= Isaac Olatunde Olubowale =

Anglican bishop in Nigeria

Isaac Olatunde Olubowale is an Anglican bishop in Nigeria: he is the current Bishop of Ekiti Oke.

A former archdeacon, Olubowale was formerly the incumbent St. James, Suleja. He was consecrated on 25 July 2004 as the pioneer Bishop of Ekiti Oke.
