= Anglican Diocese of Kontagora =

Anglican diocese in Nigeria

Coordinates: 10°24′N 5°28′E

The Anglican Diocese of Kontagora is one of eleven within the Anglican Province of Lokoja, itself one of 14 ecclesiastical provinces within the Church of Nigeria. The current bishop is the Right Rev. Jonah Ibrahim
