= Anglican Diocese of Pankshin =

Anglican diocese in Nigeria

The Anglican Diocese of Pankshin is one of ten dioceses within the Anglican Province of Jos, itself one of 14 ecclesiastical provinces within the Church of Nigeria. The current bishop is the Right Rev. Olumuyiwa Ajayi.
