= Kenneth Ifemene =

Anglican bishop in Nigeria

Kenneth Ifemene is an Anglican bishop in Nigeria: he is the current Bishop of Ikwo in the Anglican Province of Enugu.
