= Olugbenga Oduntan =

Anglican bishop in Nigeria

Olugbenga Olukemi Oduntan is an Anglican bishop in Nigeria. He is the current Bishop of Oyo.
