= Daniel Abubakar Yisa =

Anglican bishop in Nigeria

Daniel Abubakar Yisa, the Diocesan Bishop of Minna, is the Archbishop of the Anglican Province of Lokoja, one of 14 within the Church of Nigeria.

Yisa was elected Bishop of Damaturu in 1996.
