= Chidi Oparaojiaku =

Anglican bishop of Nigeria

Chidi Collins Oparaojiaku is an Anglican bishop in Nigeria: he is the current Bishop of Ohaji/Egbema.
