= Anglican Province of Aba =

Anglican province in Nigeria

The Anglican Province of Aba is one of the 14 ecclesiastical provinces of the Church of Nigeria. It comprises 9 dioceses:

- Aba (Christian Ugwuzor)
- Aba Ngwa North (Nathan Kanu)
- Arochukwu/Ohafia (Bishop: Johnson Onuoha)
- Ikwanuo (Bishop: Chigozirim Onyegbule)
- Isiala-Ngwa (Bishop: Temple Nwaogu)
- Isial-Ngwa South (Bishop: Isaac Nwaobia)
- Isikwuato (Bishop: Manasses Chijiokem Okere)
- Ukwa (Bishop: Samuel Kelechi Eze)
- Umuahia (Bishop: Ikechi Nwosu)
