= Peter Akinola =

Primate of the Church of Nigeria from 2000 to 2010

The Most Reverend Peter Akinola
- Emeritus Primate of Nigeria
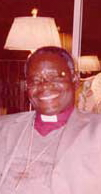
- Church: Church of Nigeria
- See: Abuja
- In office: March 2000 — March 2010
- Predecessor: Joseph Abiodun Adetiloye
- Successor: Nicholas Okoh
- Previous post: Primate of Nigeria

Orders
- Ordination: 1979
- Consecration: 16 November 1989

Personal details
- Born: 27 January 1944 (age 82) Abeokuta, Ogun, British Nigeria
- Children: 6

Peter Jasper Akinola (born 27 January 1944, in Abeokuta) is the former Anglican Primate of the Church of Nigeria. He is also the former bishop of Abuja and Archbishop of Province III, which covered the northern and central parts of the country. When the division into ecclesiastical provinces was adopted in 2002, he became the first Archbishop of Abuja Province, a position he held until 2010. He is married and a father of six.

A "low church" Evangelical, Akinola emphasizes the Bible and the teachings of the apostles (apostolic tradition) in a particular way. As one of the leaders of the Global South within the Anglican Communion, Akinola has taken a firm stand against theological developments which he contends are incompatible with the biblical teachings of Christianity and orthodox Anglicanism, notably setting himself against any revisionist interpretations of the Bible and, in particular, opposing same-sex blessings, the ordination of non-celibate homosexuals and any homosexual practice. He was a leading name of conservatives throughout the Anglican Communion, including the Convocation of Anglicans in North America.

On 15 September 2009, Archbishop Nicholas Okoh, aged 57 years old, of Bendel Province, was elected the Primate of the Church of Nigeria at the conference of the House of Bishops in Umuahia. He succeeded Akinola on 25 March 2010.

== Biography ==
Akinola was born in 1944 to a Yoruba family in Abeokuta in southwestern Nigeria. His father died when he was four years old and due to financial pressures Akinola had to leave school early. He learned carpentry and at twenty he had a successful furniture business and as patent-medicine seller. He had finished high school by distance education. He left his business, to study for the priesthood. He studied at a Nigerian Anglican Seminary and was ordained a deacon in 1978 and a priest in 1979 in the Anglican Church of Nigeria. Soon after ordination, he moved to the United States to study at the Virginia Theological Seminary, where he graduated in 1981 with a master's degree.

Returning to Nigeria afterwards, Akinola was assigned to create an Anglican presence in the new capital Abuja which was about to be built. He holds it one of his greatest successes to have created out of nothing a vibrant Anglican community there. He was consecrated a bishop on 16 November 1989 and enthroned as the first Bishop of Abuja ten days later, at the inauguration of the new Diocese of Abuja on 26 November 1989. In 1997, he became archbishop of Province III of the Church of Nigeria, consisting of the northern dioceses of Nigeria. On 22 February 2000, he was elected primate of the Church of Nigeria, the second biggest church in the Anglican Communion, then numbering 18 million members. In 2002, he became Archbishop of the Abuja Province, a position he held until 2010.

Akinola was given the National Award of Commander of the Order of the Niger CON in December 2003.

In 2006 Akinola appeared on TIME magazine's list of the world's 100 most influential people in the category Leaders and Revolutionaries. However, in 2007 TIME magazine suggested that he "has some explaining to do" in relation to his support for legislation criminalising "gay... organizations" and "Publicity, procession and public show of same-sex amorous relationship through the electronic or print media physically, directly, indirectly or otherwise".

In 2007, the Nigerian newspaper ThisDay gave him together with 17 others a "Lifetime Achievement Award", stating in its citation: "Called a bigot by some in the Anglican Church, his attitudes nonetheless represent a deep-rooted conservative tradition in African Christianity that is flourishing and growing." But he has been criticised by other sections of the international press, including the right-leaning Daily Telegraph which in an editorial on 23 March 2007 characterised him as one of the "extremists" who had "hijacked" conservative Anglicanism, and as "a deeply divisive figure" who has "defended new Nigerian legislation that makes "cancerous" (his word) same-sex activity punishable by up to five years' imprisonment."

Akinola was at one time president of the Christian Association of Nigeria, an ecumenical body bringing together 52 million Protestant, Catholic, and African independent Christians. During his presidency, the National Ecumenical Centre in Abuja was completed, which had been a building ruin for 16 years. Akinola was voted out of his position as national president of the Christian Association of Nigeria (CAN) in June 2007, and replaced by the Roman Catholic Archbishop of Nigeria, who polled 72 votes to Akinola's 33 votes. This followed criticism of Akinola's allegedly high handed leadership style and of his alleged failure to confront Nigerian president Obasanjo as other Christian leaders had. Subsequently, his candidacy as vice president was rejected by the General Assembly of the Christian Association of Nigeria.

In October 2009, he reacted to the Vatican's proposed creation of personal ordinariates for disaffected traditionalist Anglicans by saying that although he welcomed ecumenical dialogue and shared moral theology with the Catholic Church, the current GAFCON structures already meet the spiritual and pastoral needs of conservative Anglicans in Africa.

In November 2009, Akinola signed an ecumenical statement known as the Manhattan Declaration calling on evangelicals, Catholics and Orthodox not to comply with rules and laws permitting abortion, same-sex marriage and other matters that go against their religious consciences.

In 2010, upon his retirement as Primate of Nigeria, he launched the Peter Akinola Foundation, a "non-profit-making and non-governmental organisation that focuses on four main areas as Initiatives", respectively "Youth at Crossroad", "Mission and Evangelism", "Stand in the Gap" and "Anglican Unity and Self Reliance".

On 21 November 2015, Peter lost his Mother Janet Amoke Akinola. She was aged 100 years.

== Church politics ==
=== Vision of the Church of Nigeria ===
One of Akinola's first actions as primate was to convene 400 bishops, priests, lay members, and members of the Mothers' Union to discuss a new vision for the Church of Nigeria; it was chaired by Ernest Shonekan, a former Nigerian president. The vision the group posed was: "The Church of Nigeria (Anglican Communion) shall be; bible-based, spiritually dynamic, united, disciplined, self supporting, committed to pragmatic evangelism, social welfare and a Church that epitomizes the genuine love of Christ."

Part of the program of action included, for example,

- At the central level:
  - Translating the books of the liturgy into additional languages
  - Establishing a group of 3000 leading lay personalities who will take care of fundraising and relieve the bishops of this duty
  - Establishing a legal support team to enforce the constitutional right of freedom of religion and worship
  - Establishing colleges for theology and universities
  - Providing internet access for the dioceses
- for each diocese:
  - Training full-time itinerant evangelists
  - Giving on-the-job training to priests and their wives
  - Working out a social welfare program for less-privileged people
  - Establishing a hospital with at least 30 beds
  - Establishing secondary schools
- on the community level:
  - Providing literacy courses for adults
  - Setting up cottage industries for the unemployed

=== Relations with the Anglican Communion ===
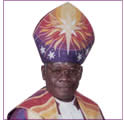
Archbishop Peter Akinola in his cope and mitre, traditional vestments.

In August 2003, he stated that if the celibate and gay Church of England priest Jeffrey John was consecrated as Bishop of Reading or the non-celibate gay American Episcopalian priest Gene Robinson was consecrated as Bishop of New Hampshire, the Church of Nigeria would leave the Anglican Communion. Several Anglican dioceses worldwide made similar statements, including the Anglican diocese in Sydney, Australia. Under pressure from the Archbishop of Canterbury, John withdrew from consideration for the bishopric and was subsequently appointed as Dean of St Albans in Hertfordshire. Gene Robinson's consecration went forward, precipitating a crisis in the Anglican Communion. At the end of 2003, Akinola commissioned, together with Drexel Gomez, the primate of the Church in the Province of the West Indies, and Gregory Venables, Presiding Bishop of the Anglican Church of the Southern Cone, Claiming our Anglican Identity: The Case Against the Episcopal Church, USA, a paper for Anglican Communion primates discussing the conservative implications of Gene Robinson's consecration.

His first reaction to the Windsor Report of 2004 was outspoken and critical, but the statement from the primates gathered at the first African Anglican Bishop's Conference, headed by Akinola, was more moderate and expressed commitment to the future of the Anglican Communion. However, while strenuously supporting those parts of the Windsor Report that addressed the issue of the Anglican Communion's treatment of non-heterosexuals, he has not followed with those parts that deplore overseas interventions in the Episcopal Church and has, on the contrary, set up a missionary body, the Convocation of Anglicans in North America, to formalise the ties between break-away Anglicans in the United States and the Church of Nigeria.

In September 2005, Akinola spoke out against the Anglican Episcopal Church of Brazil's deposition of an evangelical bishop and excommunication of over 30 priests.

In September 2005, the Church of Nigeria redefined its relationship with the Anglican Communion in its constitution, stating that it is in "Communion with all Anglican churches, dioceses, and provinces that uphold and maintain the historic faith, doctrine, sacraments, and discipline of the one Holy, Catholic, and Apostolic Church." In a later press release, Akinola clarified, "We want to state that our intention in amending the 2002 Constitution of the Church of Nigeria was to make clear that we are committed to the historic faith once delivered to the Saints, practice and the traditional formularies of the Church... We treasure our place within the worldwide family of the Anglican Communion but we are distressed by the unilateral actions of those provinces that are clearly determined to redefine what our common faith was once. We have chosen not to be yoked to them as we prefer to exercise our freedom to remain faithful. We continue to pray, however, that there will be a genuine demonstration of repentance."

On 12 November 2005, Akinola signed a Covenant of Concordat with the Presiding Bishops of the Reformed Episcopal Church and the Anglican Province of America.

Akinola refused to take Holy Communion in company with the Presiding bishop of the Episcopal Church, both at the Primates Meeting at Dromantine in 2005 and Dar es Salaam in 2007 and, on the latter occasion, he issued a press release to publicise and explain his refusal and that of others associated with him.

Akinola's name as chairman of the Global South Primates heads the list of signatories to a letter to the Archbishop of Canterbury on 15 November 2005. In this letter, Europe is described as "a spiritual desert", and the actions of the Church of England, in supporting the new civil partnerships laws, are said to give "the appearance of evil".

Three of the bishops whose names appeared on the document at the Global South website (President Bishop Clive Handford of Jerusalem and the Middle East; the primate of the West Indies, Archbishop Drexel Gomez; and the presiding bishop of the Southern Cone, Bishop Gregory Venables) denied signing or approving the letter, and criticised it as "an act of impatience", "scandalous", and "megaphone diplomacy".

Akinola was among the Global South leaders who opposed the consecration of Gene Robinson, the first openly gay bishop in the Anglican Communion. This group successfully pressed for the voluntary withdrawal of the Episcopalian representatives from the Anglican Consultative Council's meeting in Nottingham in 2005. However, there were representatives present who intended to make a presentation supporting the full inclusion of gays and lesbians in the life of the Church, for which a vote of thanks was passed.

In August 2005, he denounced a statement of the Church of England's House of Bishops on civil partnerships and called for the disciplining of the Church of England and Episcopal Church because the Communion had not changed its position on same-sex partnerships. Since the Anglican Communion has historically been defined as those churches in communion with the See of Canterbury, whose archbishop is head of the Church of England and thus primus inter pares in the Anglican Communion, this led to speculation that Akinola was positioning himself as a possible international leader of a more conservative church than the present Anglican Communion, which would no longer recognise the authority or primacy of the Archbishop of Canterbury. However, he attended the subsequent Primates Meeting in Tanzania in 2007, but he absented himself from all the celebrations of the Eucharist during that meeting.

In May 2007, he flew to the United States to install Martyn Minns, a priest who had left the Episcopal Church of the United States, as a bishop of the Church of Nigeria. Akinola reportedly ignored requests from both the presiding bishop and the Archbishop of Canterbury not to do this. However, the timing of the requests and their intent, relative to Akinola's departure from Nigeria, is a contention. The newly installed bishop indicated at a press conference that the intention was to replace the Episcopal Church as an organ of the Anglican Communion with a structure formed under the auspices of the Church of Nigeria.

Akinola was one of the principal founders of the Global Anglican Future Conference, an international gathering of conservative Anglican bishops, and declared the Church of Nigeria to be in full communion with the newly created Anglican Church in North America, which was founded to develop an alternative—albeit one unrecognized by the Church of England—ecclesiastical structure to the Episcopal Church of the United States within the Anglican Communion.

=== Homosexuality laws in Nigeria ===
In September 2006, the Standing Committee of the Church of Nigeria, headed by Akinola, issued a "Message to the Nation", taking up ten political controversies in Nigeria, among them a bill regarding same-sex relationships: "The Church commends the law-makers for their prompt reaction to outlaw same-sex relationships in Nigeria and calls for the bill to be passed since the idea expressed in the bill is the moral position of Nigerians regarding human sexuality." The bill in question, as well as criminalising same-sex marriage, also proposed to criminalise "Registration of Gay Clubs, Societies and organizations" and "Publicity, procession and public show of same-sex amorous relationship through the electronic or print media physically, directly, indirectly or otherwise", on penalty of up to 5 years of imprisonment. The United States State Department formally challenged the proposed legislation as a breach of Nigeria's obligations under the International Covenant on Civil and Political Rights. Some Western supporters of the bill justify the legislation on the basis that it does not support the stoning of non-heterosexual people under the Sharia code.

=== Reaction to Muslim cartoon riots ===
In February 2006, Muslim rioting over the Danish newspaper cartoon controversy spread to Nigeria. Rioters targeted Christians and their property, resulting in reportedly 43 deaths, 30 burned churches, and 250 destroyed shops and houses. Included among the victims was the family of one of Akinola's bishops, Benjamin Kwashi, the Bishop of Jos, who was out of the country at the time. Kwashi's home was broken into, and his wife was tortured and sexually assaulted, resulting in her temporary blindness. The rioters also severely beat Kwashi's teenage son. In response to the rioting, Akinola stated in his capacity as president of the Christian Association of Nigeria: "May we at this stage remind our Muslim brothers that they do not have the monopoly of violence in this nation." Some criticized this statement as inciting Christian counter-riots against Muslim targets in Nigeria. (For example, Christian mobs in Onitsha retaliated against Muslims, killing 80 persons, and burned a Muslim district with 100 homes, forcing hundreds of Muslims to flee the city.) American evangelical leader Rick Warren, however, wrote that Akinola's angry response "was no more characteristic than Nelson Mandela's apartheid-era statement that 'sooner or later this violence is going to spread to whites'".

Anglican Communion titles
| Preceded by J. Abiodun Adetiloye | Primate of the Anglican Church of Nigeria; 2000–2010 | Succeeded by Nicholas Okoh |
