= Geoffrey Okoroafor =

Anglican bishop in Nigeria

Geoffrey Enyinnaya Okoroafor is an Anglican bishop in Nigeria.

Okoroafor was elected Bishop of Egbu on 11 January 2013 at Agbarha-Otor, Delta State.
