= Anglican Diocese of Ekiti =

Anglican diocese in Nigeria

The Anglican Diocese of Ekiti is one of twelve within the Anglican Province of Ondo, itself one of 14 ecclesiastical provinces within the Church of Nigeria: the current bishop is Andrew Olushola Ajayi the former Bishop of Ekiti Kwara Missionary Diocese.

The diocese was established on October 29, 1966 with the late Right Rev. Micheal Adeniyi Osanyin as the Pioneer Bishop. The see is The Cathedral Church of Emmanuel, Okesha, Ado Ekiti. Formerly, Emmanuel Anglican Church, Ado Ekiti.

The Diocese is the mother of Anglican Diocese of Ekiti West- 1999 and Anglican Diocese of Ekiti Oke-2004
