= Chijioke Oti =

Anglican bishop in Nigeria

Chijioke Oti is an Anglican bishop in Nigeria: he has been Bishop of On the Lake. since 2008.

Oti previously served as a parish priest at St. Andrew, Inyishi (2001 -2005) and St. Mary, Egbuoma (2005-2008).
