= Markus Ibrahim =

Archbishop in Nigeria

Markus Ibrahim Amfani
- Occupation: Anglican bishop in Nigeria
- Known for: Bishop of Yola, Archbishop of Jos

Markus Ibrahim Amfani is an Anglican bishop in Nigeria.

He has been Bishop of Yola in the Province of Jos since 2005.

He became Archbishop of Jos in 2020.
