= Anglican Diocese of Yola =

Anglican church of Nigeria in Yola

Diocese of Yola

Location
- Ecclesiastical province: Church of Nigeria

Statistics
- Parishes: 39

Information
- Rite: Anglican
- Cathedral: St John's Cathedral, Yola

Current leadership
- Bishop: Markus Ibrahim

Website
- Church of Nigeria website

The Diocese of Yola is a diocese of the Anglican Church of Nigeria in the Province of Jos. The diocese was founded as one of the eight missionary dioceses created in northern Nigeria at the start of the Decade of Evangelism. It currently comprises six archdeaconries: Ganye, Koma Hills Parish, Mubi, Numan, Yola North and Yola South, with 39 parishes.

== History ==
The Diocese of Yola was inaugurated on 26 December 1990 with the enthronement of the first bishop, the Rt Revd Christian Efobi. The cathedral church is St John's in Yola. On 14 October 2005, the bishop's chaplain, the Rt Revd Ibrahim Markus, was enthroned as his successor, when Bishop Efobi was translated to Aguata in Imo State.

The diocese includes the largely Muslim state of Adamawa, where hundreds of people have been killed in ethno-religious violence since the return to democracy in 1999. Thus, although the growth of the church has been dramatic, the work of the bishop and clergy has also been to calm tensions and to build relationships with Muslim and political leaders.

== List of bishops ==
- Christian Efobi, 1990-2005 (C. O. Efobi; first bishop, consecrated 29 April 1990, Kaduna)
- Markus Ibrahim, 2005–present
