= Solomon Gberegbara =

Anglican bishop in Nigeria

Solomon Gberegbara is an Anglican bishop in Nigeria: he has been Bishop of Ogoni since 2005.
