= Anglican Diocese of Abuja =

Anglican diocese in Nigeria

Coordinates: 9°4′N 7°29′E

The Anglican Diocese of Abuja is one of 13 Dioceses within the Anglican Province of Abuja, itself one of 14 ecclesiastical provinces within the Church of Nigeria. As of March 2020, the bishop is the Right Rev. Archbishop Henry Ndukuba, who is also Primate of the Church of Nigeria.
