= Paul Udogu =

Anglican bishop in Nigeria

Paul Udogu is an Anglican bishop in Nigeria: he has been Bishop of Afikpo. since 2010.
