= Trinity Theological College, Umuahia =

Educational institution in Nigeria

Coordinates: 5.3204°N 7.2924°E

Trinity Theological College, Umuahia is a religious training college affiliated to the University of Nigeria.
