= Church of Nigeria =

Nigerian Anglican church

The Church of Nigeria
- Seal of the Church of Nigeria.
- Classification: Protestant
- Orientation: Anglican
- Scripture: Protestant Bible
- Theology: Anglican doctrine
- Polity: Episcopal
- Primate: Henry Ndukuba
- General Secretary: Barr Festus Opara
- Associations: Anglican Communion, GAFCON
- Full communion: Reformed Episcopal Church; Anglican Province of America; Anglican Church in North America
- Headquarters: Abuja, Nigeria
- Territory: Nigeria
- Origin: 1842; 184 years ago Badagry 1857; 169 years ago Expedition on the Niger
- Members: 18 - 25 million (2025)

The Church of Nigeria, officially styled the Church of Nigeria (Anglican Communion), is the Anglican church in Nigeria. The church claims to be the second-largest province in the Anglican Communion, as measured by baptised membership (not by attendance), after the Church of England with 18 million members.

Since 2002, the Church of Nigeria has been organised into 14 ecclesiastical provinces. It has rapidly increased the number of its dioceses and bishops from 91 in 2002 to 161 as at January 2013 and 176 from September 2025. The administrative headquarters are located in Abuja. Henry Ndukuba, Archbishop of Abuja, became its primate in 2020.

== History ==
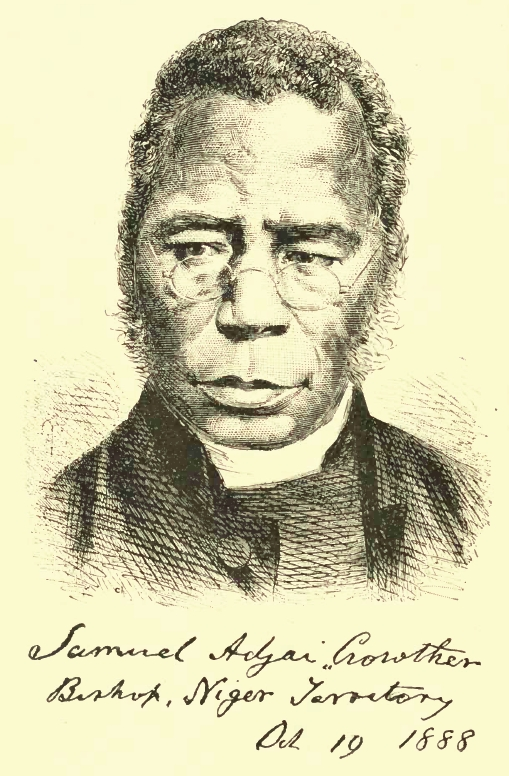
Bishop Samuel Ajayi Crowther

Christianity came to Nigeria in the 15th century through Augustinian and Capuchin Friars from Portugal. The first mission of the Church of England was, though, only established in 1842 in Badagry by Henry Townsend. In 1864, Charles Longley, the then Archbishop of Canterbury consecrated Rev Samuel Ajayi Crowther Bishop for the Niger mission, thus becoming the first African bishop and Bishop of the Niger Territories, which was subsequently renamed Diocese of Western Equatorial Africa with its headquarters in Onitsha. The Diocese of Western Equatorial Africa was divided into Diocese of Lagos (1919) and Diocese on the Niger (1920).

The two existing dioceses (Lagos and on the Niger) were followed by an additional 14 dioceses. On 24 February 1979, the sixteen dioceses of Nigeria were joined in the Church of Nigeria, a newly founded province of the Anglican Communion, with Timothy O. Olufosoye, then Bishop of Ibadan, becoming its first archbishop, primate and metropolitan. Between 1980 and 1988, eight additional dioceses were created. In 1986, he was succeeded by J. Abiodun Adetiloye who became the second primate and metropolitan of Nigeria, a position he would hold until 1999.

In 1989, the Diocese of Abuja was created on the area of the new capital of Nigeria with Peter Akinola as first bishop.

The 1990s was the decade of evangelization for the Church of Nigeria, starting with the consecration of mission bishops for the mission dioceses of Minna, Kafanchan, Katsina, Sokoto, Makurdi, Yola, Maiduguri, Bauchi, Egbado and Ife. Between 1993 and 1996 the primate founded nine dioceses; Oke-Osun, Sabongidda-Ora, Okigwe North, Okigwe South, Ikale-Ilaje, Kabba, Nnewi, Egbu and Niger Delta North. In December 1996 five more mission dioceses were added in the north — Kebbi, Dutse, Damaturu, Jalingo and Otukpo — and their respective first bishops elected. In 1997 and 1998 four more dioceses were established; Wusasa, Abakaliki, Ughelli and Ibadan North. In 1999 the Church of Nigeria added 13 new dioceses; four in July (Oji River, Ideato, Ibadan South and Offa), eight in November (Lagos West, Ekiti West, Gusau, Gombe, Niger Delta West, Gwagwalada, Lafia and Bida) and Oleh in December. So within 10 years there were 27 new regular dioceses and 15 mission dioceses created. The Archbishop of Canterbury declared the Church of Nigeria to be the fastest growing church in the Anglican Communion.

In 1997, the Church of Nigeria was split into three ecclesiastical provinces (see below).

In 2000, Archbishop Peter Akinola succeeded Archbishop Adetiloye as primate of the Church of Nigeria. One of his first actions as primate was to get together 400 bishops, priests, lay members and members of the Mothers' Union to elaborate a vision for the Church of Nigeria under the chairmanship of Ernest Shonekan, a former President of Nigeria. The vision elaborated was:

The Church of Nigeria (Anglican Communion) shall be; Bible-based, spiritually dynamic, united, disciplined, self supporting, committed to pragmatic evangelism, social welfare and a Church that epitomizes the genuine love of Christ.

The program of action included among others additional translations of the liturgy, establishing a lay fundraising team, establishing a legal support to ensure freedom of religion and worship, establishing theological colleges and universities, internet access for all dioceses, training evangelists, priests and their wives, social welfare programs, hospitals, secondary schools, literacy courses and setting up cottage industries.

In 2005, as one of the goals of the Vision of the Church of Nigeria, the church-owned Ajayi Crowther University in Oyo was granted license to operate as a private university in Nigeria on 7 January 2005.

== Structure and leadership ==
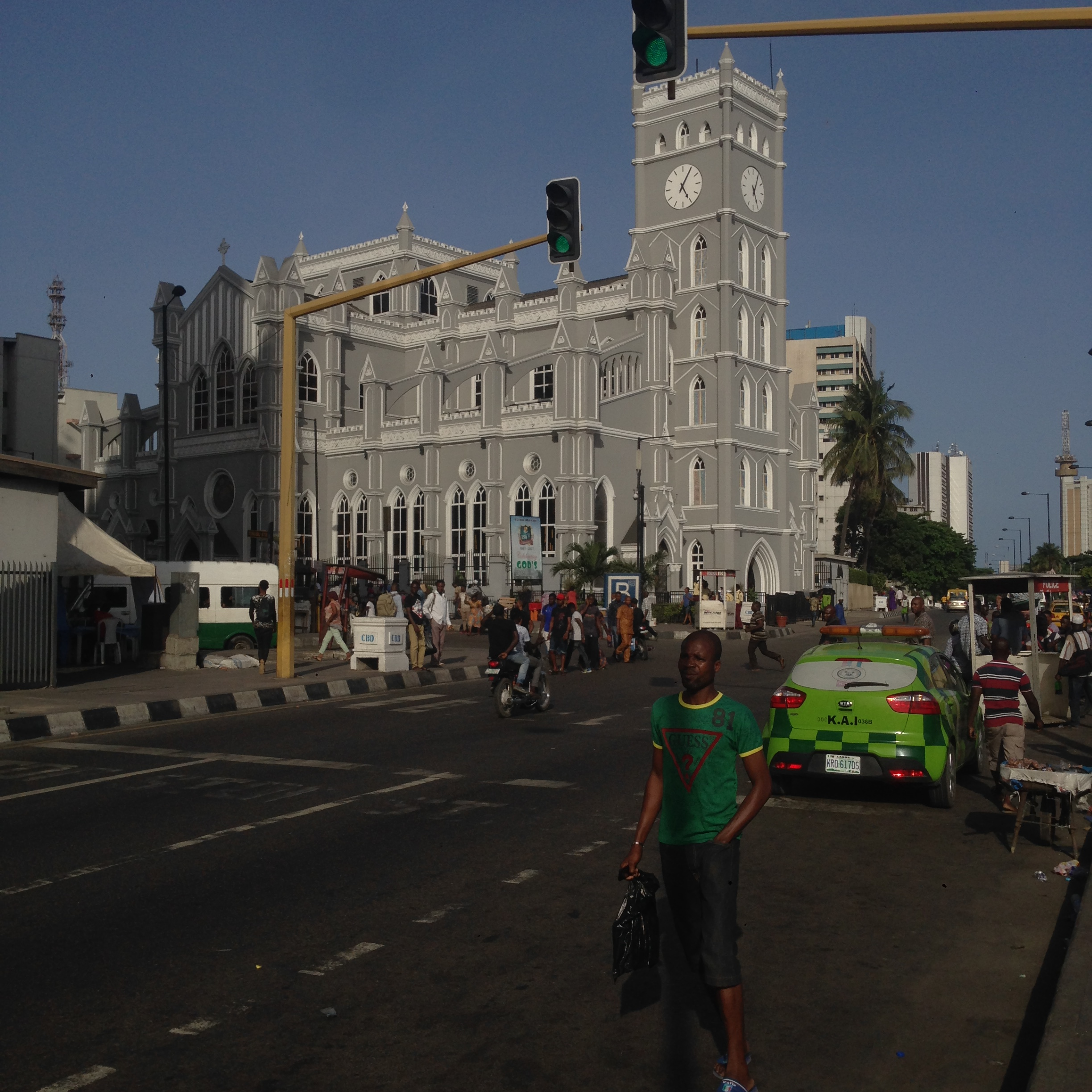
Cathedral Church of Christ, Lagos

In 1997, as a result of rapid expansion, the Church of Nigeria was split into three internal ecclesiastical provinces:

- Province 1, consisting of the dioceses in the West, headed by Archbishop Joseph Abiodun Adetiloye, who remained Primate of All Nigeria, and metropolitan archbishop.
- Province 2, consisting of the Eastern dioceses, headed by Benjamin Nwankiti, Bishop of Owerri as metropolitan archbishop.
- Province 3, consisting of the Northern dioceses, headed by Peter Akinola, Bishop of Abuja, as metropolitan archbishop.

In 2002 the Church of Nigeria was again reorganised, this time into 10 ecclesiastical provinces.

The rapid expansion has continued, and as of 2012 there were 14 archbishops, heading 14 ecclesiastical provinces, with a total of 161 dioceses.

The fourteen ecclesiastical provinces are:

- Aba - (Archbishop: Isaac Chijioke Nwaobia)
- Abuja - (Archbishop: Henry Ndukuba)
- Bendel - (Archbishop: Cyril Odutemu)
- Enugu - (Archbishop: Emmanuel Chukwuma)
- Ibadan - (Archbishop: Abiodun Olaoye)
- Jos - (Archbishop: Markus Ibrahim)
- Kaduna - (Archbishop: Timothy Yahaya)
- Kwara - (Archbishop: Israel Amoo)
- Lagos - (Archbishop: Michael Olusina Fape)
- Lokoja - (Archbishop: Daniel Abubakar Yisa)
- Niger - (Archbishop: Alex Ibezim)
- Niger Delta - (Archbishop: Blessing Enyindah)
- Ondo - (Archbishop: Simeon Borokini)
- Owerri - (Archbishop: David Onuoha)

== Primate ==
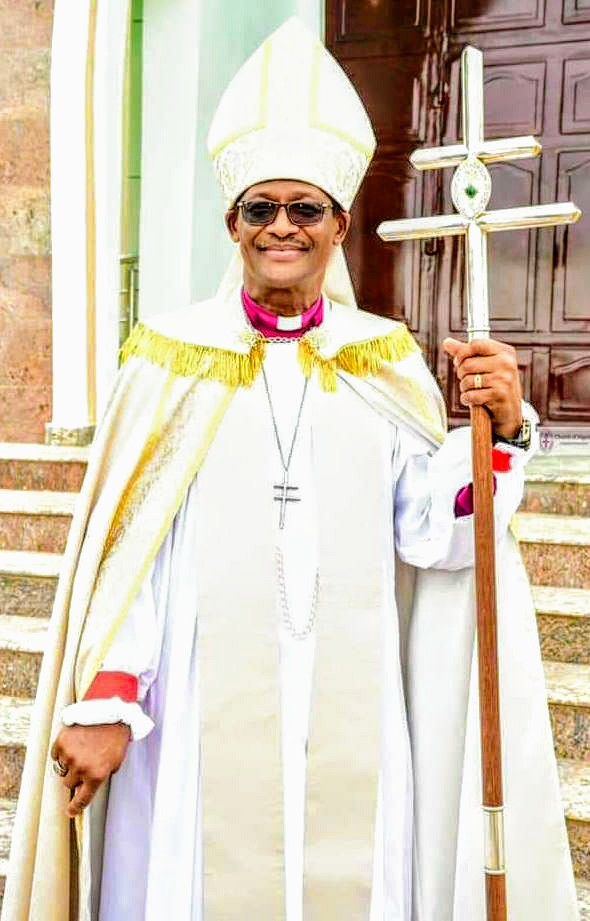
Henry Chukwudum Ndukuba, appointed Primate of the Church of Nigeria (Anglican Communion) in 2020.

The fourteen archbishops each hold metropolitan authority within their respective provinces. One of them is additionally the Primate and bears the title "Primate of All Nigeria". The primates of the Church of Nigeria have been:

| Name | Years |
|---|---|
| Timothy O. Olufosoye | 1979–1986 |
| Joseph Abiodun Adetiloye | 1986–1999 |
| Peter Akinola | 2000–2010 |
| Nicholas Okoh | 2010–2020 |
| Henry Ndukuba | 2020- |

== Membership ==
The Church of Nigeria officially claims 18 million members, although academic research has reported other membership figures. The World Christian Database, published in 2021, estimated there were 21,604,000 members of the Church of Nigeria. In 2016, it stated that its membership was “over 18 million", out of a total Nigerian population of 190 million. The BBC and research published by the University of Aberdeen reported the church had 22 million members or 10% of the Nigerian population. It is "effectively the largest province in the Communion." In 2025, GAFCON, of which the church is a member, claimed that the Church of Nigeria had grown to include 25 million members which would make it the largest province in the Anglican Communion. As of 2025, however, the Church of Nigeria continues to report 1,750,000 members to the World Council of Churches.

A peer-reviewed study published in the Journal of Anglican Studies by Cambridge University Press concluded that, as measured by active membership, the Church of Nigeria has nearly 2 million active baptised members, depending on the metric used. According to a study published by Cambridge University Press in the Journal of Anglican Studies, there are between 4.94 and 11.74 million Anglicans in Nigeria. In 2017, Growth and Decline in the Anglican Communion: 1980 to the Present, published by Routledge, collected research reporting there were 20,100,000 members of the church in Nigeria. In 2020, a quantitative peer-reviewed study reported 7.4 million people in Nigeria identified as Anglicans in 2015. According to another study published in 2020 in the Journal of Anglican Studies, the 18 million figure was challenged, estimating there are fewer than 8 million Anglicans in Nigeria. The Church of Nigeria is the largest Anglican province on the continent of Africa, accounting for 41.7% of Anglicans in Sub-Saharan Africa, and is "probably the first [largest within the Anglican Communion] in terms of active members."

== Anglican realignment ==
The Church of Nigeria has continuously opposed the liberal inclinations of the Episcopal Church of the United States and the Anglican Church of Canada, which led to the acceptance of non-celibate homosexuality and non-celibate homosexual clergy. The church has also opposed the decisions made by the Church of England to accept celibate same-sex relationships and clergy in celibate same-sex relationships, including civil unions. The former primate, Peter Akinola, become prominent as a leader of conservatives within the Anglican Communion. After the ordination of a partnered gay man, Gene Robinson, as a bishop of the Diocese of New Hampshire, in the United States, he threatened that it was a measure that could split the Anglican Communion. As a first step, the church declared itself in "impaired communion" with the Episcopal Church USA on 21 November 2003. In September 2005 the Church of Nigeria reworded its constitution to redefine, from its point of view, the Anglican Communion, no longer as "Provinces in communion with the See of Canterbury" but instead "all Anglican Churches, Dioceses and Provinces that hold and maintain the ‘Historic Faith, Doctrine, Sacrament and Discipline of the one Holy, Catholic, and Apostolic Church'." Also in 2005, Archbishop Akinola criticised the Church of England for allowing clergy in same-sex civil partnerships saying that "[it] proposes same-sex marriage ‘in everything but name’ and that the proposal to extract a promise from gay clergy who register for civil unions to abstain from sexual relations is ‘totally unworkable’ and 'invites deception and ridicule'." In 2021, Archbishop Ndukuba reiterated the church's opposition to actions within the churches of "The Episcopal Church of the USA, Canada, [and the] UK..." and his commitment to GAFCON.

On November 12, 2005, the church entered into a "Covenant of Concordat" with the Reformed Episcopal Church and the Anglican Province of America, two conservative groups of Anglican origin but outside the Anglican Communion, which do not recognize the Episcopal Church USA. In October and December 2006, several Episcopal churches in Virginia declared themselves out of communion with the Episcopal Church USA due to their opposition to their stance on homosexuality and joined the Church of Nigeria through the Convocation of Anglicans in North America, a mission originally started by the Church of Nigeria to support Nigerian Anglicans in the United States. It now mostly consists of non-Nigerian, theologically conservative American Anglicans, and initially began under the oversight of two bishops; Bishop Martyn Minns and a suffragan bishop, David Bena, who are simultaneously bishops of the Church of Nigeria. The Church of Nigeria is currently in full communion with the Anglican Church in North America, founded in June 2009, launched as a conservative alternative to the liberal tendencies of the Episcopal Church of the United States and the Anglican Church of Canada. The first of four new American dioceses for the ACNA established by the Church of Nigeria, under the oversight of the missionary bishop of CANA, was the Missionary Diocese of the Trinity which was inaugurated on 19 August 2012 by Archbishop Nicholas Okoh. Now reconstituted as the Church of Nigeria North American Mission, CONNAM consists of two U.S. dioceses primarily composed of Nigerian immigrants. In 2022, conflict emerged between the ACNA and the Church of Nigeria as a bishop from the Church of Nigeria led a mob and reportedly attacked members of the ACNA congregation.

The Church of Nigeria took a 470 members delegation, led by Archbishop Nicholas Okoh and including several archbishops and bishops to the GAFCON II, that took place from 21 to 26 October 2013, in Nairobi, Kenya.

The Church of Nigeria was represented at GAFCON III, held in Jerusalem, on 17–22 June 2018, by a 472 members delegation, the largest from any Anglican province. In 2026, the Archbishop of the Anglican Province of the Niger and the Diocese of Awka declared their intention to possibly separate from the Church of Nigeria, and to continue to affiliate with the Church of England.

== Ordination of women ==
The Church of Nigeria does not recognise the ordination of women to the priesthood or the episcopate. In 2010, then Archbishop Nicholas Oko permitted the ordination of women to the diaconate within limitations. Several women were ordained deacons by dioceses in the Niger Delta. However, the permission to ordain women as deacons was discontinued in the Diocese of CANA by 2021 according to Bishop Felix Orji; he claimed that women ordained deacons in that diocese prior to the discontinuation are allowed to continue to serve. More recent sources continue to confirm that the Church of Nigeria ordains women to the diaconate. Researchers, publishing in 2025, at the Nnamdi Azikiwe University in Awka, Nigeria found that some dioceses continue to ordain women as deacons.

As of January, 2021, the Church of Nigeria was one of two member churches of the Anglican Communion that has ordained women as deacons, albeit for limited roles, but not as priests or bishops. Women are allowed to serve in lay leadership roles, including "synod delegates, parish church council members...wardens, lay readers, choir directors, and organists, among other leadership roles."

== Ecumenical relations ==
In October 2009, the Nigerian church's leadership reacted to the Vatican's proposed creation of personal ordinariates for disaffected traditionalist Anglicans by saying that although it welcomed ecumenical dialogue and shared moral theology with the Catholic Church, the current GAFCON structures already meet the spiritual and pastoral needs of conservative Anglicans in Africa. In 2025, the Church of Nigeria severed ties with the Church in Wales and Church of England, and declared they no longer recognise the Archbishop of Canterbury as 'first among equals.'

== See also ==
- Anglican Adam Preaching Society
- Cornelius Adam Igbudu
- African-initiated church
- List of the largest Protestant bodies
- New religious movement
