= List of Anglican Communion dioceses =

This is an alphabetical list of bishops and archbishops of the Anglican Communion, with links to articles about their dioceses or provinces where possible.

As of 2020 the Anglican Communion (as recognised by the Anglican Consultative Council) consists of 865 dioceses and 18 additional Ordinary jurisdictions (see list below) giving a total of 883 bishops; this total includes 77 archbishops (or equivalents, such as 'Presiding Bishop'), of whom 41 have the status of 'primate', and membership of the Primates' Meeting. There are, additionally, many suffragan or assistant bishops, as well as bishops of non-Anglican churches that are also in full communion with the Archbishop of Canterbury through arrangements such as the Porvoo Communion.

There is also a number of bishops in different denominations of the Continuing Anglican movement. Continuing Anglicanism is outside the Anglican Communion.

== Archbishops ==
=== Primates and metropolitans ===
Primatial archbishops shown at first level, and additional metropolitan archbishops (of the same national or regional church) at second level (indented). The most common title for Primates and Metropolitans is 'Archbishop', but some of those listed, whilst carrying out a similar function, bear an alternative title (such as Presiding Bishop, or Bishop Primus) for historical reasons.

- Archbishop of Alexandria
- Archbishop of Armagh (Primate of all Ireland)
  - Archbishop of Dublin (Primate of Ireland)
- Primate of Australia (Primate, elected from amongst the following five metropolitans)
  - Archbishop of Adelaide
  - Archbishop of Brisbane
  - Archbishop of Melbourne
  - Archbishop of Sydney
  - Archbishop of Perth
- Moderator and Primate of Church of Bangladesh and Archbishop of Dhaka (Primate of All Bangladesh)
- Primate of Brazil
- Archbishop of Burundi
- Metropolitan Bishop of Calcutta (this Bishopric ceased to have Metropolitical status after 1970)
- Primate of Canada (Primate, in addition to the following four metropolitans)
  - Metropolitan of the Province of British Columbia and Yukon
  - Metropolitan of the Province of Canada
  - Metropolitan of the Province of Ontario
  - Metropolitan of the Province of Rupert's Land
- Archbishop of Canterbury (Primate of all England)
  - Archbishop of York (Primate of England)
- Archbishop of Cape Town
- Archbishop of Central Africa
- Archbishop of Central America
- Primate and Presiding Bishop of the Anglican Church of Chile
- Archbishop of Congo
- Archbishop of Hong Kong (Primate of Hong Kong)
- Archbishop of the Indian Ocean
- Primate of Nippon Sei So Kai
- President Bishop of Jerusalem and the Middle East
- Primate and Archbishop of All Kenya (Episcopal see fixed at All Saints Cathedral, Nairobi)
- Archbishop of Korea (Episcopal see fixed at Seoul)
- Archbishop of Melanesia (Episcopal see fixed at Honiara, and called 'Central Melanesia')
- Archbishop of Mexico
- Archbishop of Myanmar (Episcopal see fixed at Yangon)
- Primate of New Zealand (Primacy shared among the leaders of the three tikangas of the Anglican Church)
  - Te Pīhopa o Aotearoa and Archbishop and Primate of the Anglican Church in Aotearoa, New Zealand and Polynesia (Archbishop chosen from amongst the five Māori personal prelatures - see below)
  - Senior Bishop of the New Zealand Dioceses and Archbishop and Primate of the Anglican Church in Aotearoa, New Zealand and Polynesia (Archbishop chosen from amongst the New Zealand mainland dioceses)
  - Bishop of Polynesia and Archbishop and Primate of the Anglican Church in Aotearoa, New Zealand and Polynesia (Episcopal see fixed at Polynesia)
- Primate of All Nigeria (Primate, elected from amongst the following fourteen metropolitans)
  - Archbishop of the ecclesiastical province of Aba
  - Archbishop of the ecclesiastical province of Abuja
  - Archbishop of the ecclesiastical province of Bendel
  - Archbishop of the ecclesiastical province of Enugu
  - Archbishop of the ecclesiastical province of Ibadan
  - Archbishop of the ecclesiastical province of Jos
  - Archbishop of the ecclesiastical province of Kaduna
  - Archbishop of the ecclesiastical province of Kwara
  - Archbishop of the ecclesiastical province of Lagos
  - Archbishop of the ecclesiastical province of Lokoja
  - Archbishop of the ecclesiastical province of Niger Delta
  - Archbishop of the ecclesiastical province of Ondo
  - Archbishop of the ecclesiastical province of Owerri
  - Archbishop of the ecclesiastical province of Niger
- Moderator of the Church of North India (Status equivalent to a primate)
- Moderator of the Church of Pakistan (Status equivalent to a primate)
- Archbishop of Papua New Guinea
- Prime Bishop of the Philippines
- Archbishop of Rwanda (Episcopal see fixed at Gasabo)
- Primus of the Scottish Episcopal Church
- Archbishop of South East Asia
- Moderator of the Church of South India (Status equivalent to a primate)
- Presiding Bishop of South America
- Archbishop of South Sudan (Primate, in addition to the following eight metropolitans) (Episcopal see fixed at Juba)
  - Archbishop of Amadi
  - Archbishop of Central Equatoria
  - Archbishop of Eastern Bahr el Ghazal
  - Archbishop of Eastern Equatoria
  - Archbishop of Jonglei
  - Archbishop of Northern Bahr el Ghazal
  - Archbishop of Upper Nile
  - Archbishop of Western Equatoria
- Archbishop of Sudan (Episcopal see fixed at Khartoum)
- Archbishop of Tanzania
- Archbishop of Uganda (Episcopal see fixed at Kampala)
- Presiding Bishop of the Episcopal Church (United States of America)
- Archbishop of Wales
- Archbishop of West Africa (Primate, always the longest-serving of the two metropolitans shown below)
  - Metropolitan Archbishop of West Africa
  - Metropolitan Archbishop of Ghana
- Archbishop of the West Indies

=== Non-metropolitan ===
Non-metropolitan archiepiscopal sees are rarer in Anglicanism than in other historic denominations. At present the following exist.

- National Indigenous Anglican Archbishop (Canada) - formerly a bishopric, it was raised to a non-metropolitan archbishopric in 2019.
- Archbishop in Jerusalem - an archbishopric until 1974, then a bishopric; in 2014 synod voted to restore the title Archbishop in Jerusalem for the bishop of the diocese of Jerusalem to reflect his representative role in the Holy Land on behalf of the Anglican Communion. The Archbishop in Jerusalem is eligible for election as Primate of the Episcopal Church in Jerusalem and The Middle East, but bears the title archbishop regardless of whether or not he is the primate and metropolitan.

== Bishops ==
This is a list of Anglican Diocesan Bishops only. It does not include suffragan bishops, area bishops, coadjutor bishops, assistant bishops, or bishops of ordinariates.

=== A ===
- Aba (province) - see Archbishops (above)
- Bishop of Aba (Nigeria)
- Bishop of Aba Ngwa North (Nigeria)
- Bishop of Abakaliki (Nigeria)
- Bishop of Aberdeen and Orkney (Scotland)
- Abuja (province) - see Archbishops (above)
- Bishop of Abuja (Nigeria)
- Bishop of Abyei (South Sudan)
- Bishop of Accra (Ghana)
- Adelaide - see Archbishops (above)
- Bishop of Afikpo (Nigeria)
- Bishop of Agra (India)
- Bishop of Aguata (Nigeria)
- Bishop of Ahoada (Nigeria)
- Bishop of Aipo Rongo (Papua New Guinea)
- Bishop of Ajayi Crowther (Nigeria)
- Bishop of Akobo (South Sudan)
- Bishop of Akoko (Nigeria)
- Bishop of Akoko Edo (Nigeria)
- Bishop of Akot (South Sudan)
- Bishop of Akure (Nigeria)
- Bishop of Alabama (USA)
- Bishop of Alaska (USA)
- Bishop of Albany (USA)
- Alexandria (province) - see Archbishops (above)
- Bishop of Algoma (Canada)
- Bishop of All Saints Cathedral Diocese (Kenya)
- Bishop of Aluakluak (South Sudan)
- Bishop of the Amazon (Brazil)
- Bishop of Amichi (Nigeria)
- Bishop of Amritsar (India)
- Bishop of Andaman and Car Nicobar Islands (India)
- Bishop of Angola (Angola)
- Bishop of Ankole (Uganda)
- Bishop of Antananarivo (Madagascar)
- Bishop of Antsiranana (Madagascar)
- Bishop of Aotearoa (New Zealand)
- Bishop of the Arctic (Canada)
- Bishop of Argentina (Argentina)
- Bishop of Argyll and the Isles (Scotland)
- Bishop of Arizona (USA)
- Bishop of Arkansas (USA)
- Armagh - see Archbishops (above)
- Bishop of Armidale (Australia)
- Bishop of Arochukwu/Ohafia (Nigeria)
- Bishop of Aru (Congo)
- Bishop of Asaba (Nigeria)
- Bishop of Asante-Mampong (Ghana)
- Bishop of Athabasca (Canada)
- Bishop of Athooch (South Sudan)
- Bishop of Atlanta (USA)
- Bishop of Auckland (New Zealand)
- Bishop of Aweil (South Sudan)
- Bishop of Awerial (South Sudan)
- Bishop of Awgu/Aninri (Nigeria)
- Bishop of Awka (Nigeria)
- Bishop of Awori (Nigeria)
- Bishop of Ayod (South Sudan)

=== B ===
- Bishop of Badagry (Nigeria)
- Bishop of Bukuru (Nigeria)
- Bishop of Ballarat (Australia)
- Bishop of Bangor (Wales)
- Bishop of Banks and Torres (Vanuatu)
- Bishop of Barbados (Barbados)
- Bishop of Bari (Nigeria)
- Bishop of Barisal (Bangladesh)
- Bishop of Barrackpore (India)
- Bishop of Bath and Wells (England)
- Bishop of Bathurst (Australia)
- Bishop of Bauchi (Nigeria)
- Bishop of Belize (Belize)
- Bendel (province) - see Archbishops (above)
- Bishop of Bendigo (Australia)
- Bishop of Benin (Nigeria)
- Bishop of Bentiu (South Sudan)
- Bishop of Bermuda (Bermuda)
- Bishop of Bethlehem, Pennsylvania (USA)
- Bishop of Bhopal (India)
- Bishop of Bida (Nigeria)
- Bishop of Birmingham (England)
- Bishop of Blackburn (England)
- Bloemfontein - see under Diocese of the Free State
- Bishop of Bo (Sierra Leone)
- Bishop of Boga (Congo)
- Bishop of Bolivia (Bolivia)
- Bombay - see under Mumbai
- Bishop of Bondo (Kenya)
- Bishop of Bor (South Sudan)
- Bishop of Botswana (Botswana)
- Bishop of Bradford (England)
- Bishop of Brandon (Canada)
- Bishop of Brasilia (Brazil)
- Bishop of Brechin (Scotland)
- Brisbane - see Archbishops (above)
- Bishop of Bristol (England)
- Bishop of British Columbia (Canada)
- Bishop of Buhiga (Burundi)
- Anglican Bishop of Bujumbura (Burundi)
- Bishop of Bukavu (Congo)
- Bishop of Bukedi (Uganda)
- Bishop of Bunbury (Australia)
- Bishop of Bungoma (Kenya)
- Bishop of Bunyoro-Kitara (Uganda)
- Burundi - see Archbishops (above)
- Bishop of Busan (Korea)
- Bishop of Busoga (Uganda)
- Bishop of Butare (Rwanda)
- Bishop of Butere (Kenya)
- Bishop of Buye (Burundi)
- Bishop of Byumba (Rwanda)

=== C ===
- Bishop of Calabar (Nigeria)
- Bishop of Calcutta (India)
- Bishop of Caledonia (Canada)
- Bishop of Calgary (Canada)
- Bishop of California (USA)
- Bishop of Cameroon (Cameroon)
- Bishop of Canberra and Goulburn (Australia)
- Canterbury - see Archbishops (above)
- Bishop of Cape Coast (Ghana)
- Cape Town - see Archbishops (above)
- Bishop of Carlisle (England)
- Bishop of Cashel and Ossory (Ireland)
- Central Africa - see Archbishops (above)
- Central America - see Archbishops (above)
- Bishop of Central Buganda (Uganda)
- Bishop of Central Ecuador (Ecuador)
- Bishop of Central Florida (USA)
- Bishop of the Central Gulf Coast (USA)
- Bishop of Central Melanesia (Solomon Islands)
- Bishop of Central Newfoundland (Canada)
- Bishop of Central New York (USA)
- Bishop of Central Pennsylvania (USA)
- Bishop of Central Philippines (Philippines)
- Bishop of Central Solomons (Solomon Islands)
- Bishop of Central Tanganyika (Tanzania)
- Diocese of Central Zambia (Zambia)
- Diocese of Central Zimbabwe (Zimbabwe)
- Bishop of Chandigarh (India)
- Bishop of Chelmsford (England)
- Bishop of Chester (England)
- Bishop of Chhattisgarh (India)
- Bishop of Chicago (USA) (Historic List of Bishops of Chicago)
- Bishop of Chichester (England)
- Chile - see Archbishops (above)
- Bishop of Chotanagpur (India)
- Bishop of Christ the King (South Africa)
- Bishop of Christchurch (New Zealand)
- Bishop of Chubu (Japan)
- Bishop of Clogher (Ireland)
- Bishop of Coimbatore (India)
- Bishop of Colombia (Colombia)
- Bishop of Colorado (USA)
- Bishop of Colombo (Sri Lanka)
- Bishop of Concepción (Chile)
- Congo - see Archbishops (above)
- Bishop of Connor (Ireland)
- Bishop of Connecticut (USA)
- Bishop of Cork, Cloyne and Ross (Ireland)
- Bishop of Costa Rica (Costa Rica)
- Bishop of Coventry (England)
- Bishop of Cuba (Cuba)
- Bishop of Cueibet (South Sudan)
- Anglican Bishop of Cuernavaca (Mexico)
- Bishop of Curitiba (Brazil)
- Bishop of Cuttack (India)
- Bishop of Cyangugu (Rwanda)
- Bishop of Cyprus and the Gulf (Cyprus, Iraq, Kuwait, Bahrain, Qatar, UAE, Oman, Yemen, & Arabian Peninsula)

=== D ===
- Bishop of Daejeon (Korea)
- Bishop of Dallas (USA)
- Bishop of Damaturu (Nigeria)
- Bishop of Dar-es-Salaam (Tanzania)
- Bishop of Delhi (India)
- Bishop of Delaware (USA)
- Bishop of Derby (England)
- Bishop of Derry and Raphoe (Ireland)
- Bishop of Dhaka (Bangladesh)
- Bishop of the Diocese of the Free State (South Africa)
- Bishop of On the Coast (Nigeria)
- Bishop of On the Lake (Nigeria)
- Bishop of Dogura (Papua New Guinea)
- Bishop of Doko (Nigeria)
- Bishop of the Dominican Republic (Dominican Republic)
- Bishop of Dornakal (India)
- Bishop of Down and Dromore (Ireland)
- Dublin - see Archbishops (above)
- Bishop of Duk (South Sudan)
- Bishop of Dunedin (New Zealand)
- Bishop of Dunkwa-on-Offin (Ghana)
- Bishop of Durgapur (India)
- Bishop of Durham (England)
- Bishop of Dutse (Nigeria)

=== E ===
- Bishop of East Carolina (USA)
- Bishop of East Kerala (India)
- Bishop of East Ruwenzori (Uganda)
- Bishop of East Tennessee (USA)
- Bishop of the Eastern Himalayas (India)
- Bishop of the Diocese of Eastern Kowloon (Hong Kong)
- Bishop of Eastern Michigan (USA)
- Bishop of Eastern Newfoundland and Labrador (Canada)
- Bishop of Eastern Oregon (USA)
- Bishop of Eastern Zambia (Zambia)
- Bishop of Easton (USA)
- Bishop of Eau Claire (USA)
- Bishop of Edinburgh (Scotland)
- Bishop of Edmonton (Canada)
- Bishop of Egba (Nigeria)
- Bishop of Egba West (Nigeria)
- Egbado (Nigeria) - see under Yewa
- Bishop of Egbu (Nigeria)
- Bishop of Egypt (Egypt)
- Bishop of Eha-Amufu Missionary (Nigeria)
- Bishop of Ekiti (Nigeria)
- Bishop of Ekiti Kwara (Nigeria)
- Bishop of Ekiti Oke (Nigeria)
- Bishop of Ekiti West (Nigeria)
- Bishop of El Camino Real (USA)
- Bishop of El-Obeid (Sudan)
- Diocese of El Salvador (El Salvador)
- Bishop of Eldoret (Kenya)
- Bishop of Ely (England)
- Bishop of Embu (Kenya)
- Enugu (province) - see Archbishops (above)
- Bishop of Enugu (Nigeria)
- Bishop of Enugu North (Nigeria)
- Bishop of Esan (Nigeria)
- Bishop of Etche (Nigeria)
- Bishop of Etsako (Nigeria)
- Bishop of Evo (Nigeria)
- Bishop of Exeter (England)
- Bishop of Ezo (South Sudan)

=== F ===
- Bishop of Faisalabad (Pakistan)
- Bishop of the Falkland Islands (Falkland Islands, South Georgia, British Antarctic Territory)
- Bishop of False Bay (South Africa)
- Bishop of Fianarantsoa (Madagascar)
- Bishop of Florida (USA)
- Bishop of Fond du Lac (USA)
- Bishop of Fort Worth (USA)
- Bishop of Fredericton (Canada)
- Bishop of the Free State (South Africa)
- Bishop of Freetown (Sierra Leone)

=== G ===
- Bishop of Gahini (Rwanda)
- Bishop of Gambella (Gambela Region of Ethiopia)
- Bishop of the Gambia (Gambia)
- Bishop of Gasabo (Rwanda)
- Bishop of Gboko (Nigeria)
- Bishop of George (South Africa)
- Bishop of Georgia (USA)
- Bishop of Gibraltar in Europe (Gibraltar and mainland European nations)
- Bishop of Gippsland (Australia)
- Bishop of Gitega (Burundi)
- Bishop of Glasgow and Galloway (Scotland)
- Glendalough - see Archbishop of Dublin
- Bishop of Gloucester (England)
- Bishop of Gogrial (South Sudan)
- Bishop of Gombe (Nigeria)
- Bishop of Grafton (Australia)
- Bishop of Grahamstown (South Africa)
- Bishop of Guatemala (Guatemala)
- Bishop of Guildford (England)
- Bishop of Guinea (Guinea)
- Bishop of Gujarat (India)
- Bishop of Gusau (Nigeria)
- Bishop of Guyana (Guyana)
- Bishop of Gwagwalada (Nigeria)

=== H ===
- Bishop of Haiti (Haiti)
- Bishop of Hanuato'o (Solomon Islands)
- Bishop of Harare (Zimbabwe)
- Bishop of Hawaii (USA)
- Bishop of Hereford (England)
- Bishop of Highveld (South Africa)
- Bishop of Ho (Ghana)
- Bishop of Hokkaido (Japan)
- Bishop of Honduras (Honduras)
- Hong Kong - see Archbishops (above)
- Bishop of Hong Kong Island (Hong Kong)
- Bishop of the Horn of Africa (Ethiopia, Eritrea, Djibouti, Somalia)
- Bishop of Hpa-an (Myanmar, formerly Burma)
- Bishop of Huron (Canada)
- Bishop of Hyderabad (Pakistan)

=== I ===
- Ibadan (province) - see Archbishops (above)
- Bishop of Ibadan (Nigeria)
- Bishop of Ibadan North (Nigeria)
- Bishop of Ibadan South (Nigeria)
- Bishop of Idah (Nigeria)
- Bishop of Idaho (USA)
- Bishop of Ideato (Nigeria)
- Bishop of Idoani (Nigeria)
- Bishop of Ife (Nigeria)
- Bishop of Ife East (Nigeria)
- Bishop of Ifo (Nigeria)
- Bishop of Igbomina (Nigeria)
- Bishop of Igbomina-West (Nigeria)
- Bishop of Ihiala (Nigeria)
- Bishop of Ijebu (Nigeria)
- Bishop of Ijebu-North (Nigeria)
- Bishop of Ijesa North East (Nigeria)
- Bishop of Ijesha North Missionary (Nigeria)
- Bishop of Ijumu (Nigeria)
- Ikale-Ilaje (Nigeria) - see under Diocese on the Coast
- Bishop of Ikara (Nigeria)
- Bishop of Ikeduru (Nigeria)
- Bishop of Ikka (Nigeria)
- Bishop of Ikwerre (Nigeria)
- Bishop of Ikwo (Nigeria)
- Bishop of Ikwuano (Nigeria)
- Bishop of Ilaje (Nigeria)
- Bishop of Ile-Oluji (Nigeria)
- Bishop of Ilesa (Nigeria)
- Bishop of Ilesa South West (Nigeria)
- Indian Ocean - see Archbishops (above)
- Bishop of Indianapolis (USA)
- Bishop of Iowa (USA)
- Bishop in Iran (Iran)
- Bishop of Irele-Eseodo (Nigeria)
- Bishop of Isiala-Ngwa South (Nigeria)
- Bishop of Isiala-Ngwa (Nigeria)
- Bishop of Isuikwuato (Nigeria)
- The Isles (Scotland) - see under Argyll and the Isles

=== J ===
- Bishop of Jabalpur (India)
- Bishop of Jaffna (Sri Lanka)
- Bishop of Jalingo (Nigeria)
- Bishop of Jamaica and the Cayman Islands (Jamaica / Cayman Islands)
- Japan - see Archbishops (above)
- Bishop of Jebba (Nigeria)
- Bishop in Jerusalem (Israel, Jordan, Palestine, Syria, Lebanon)
- Bishop of Johannesburg (South Africa)
- Jos (province) - see Archbishops (above)
- Bishop of Jos (Anglican) (Nigeria)
- Bishop of Juba (South Sudan)

=== K ===
- Bishop of Kabba (Nigeria)
- Bishop of Kadugli and the Nuba Mountains (Sudan)
- Kaduna (province) - see Archbishops (above)
- Bishop of Kaduna (Nigeria)
- Bishop of Kafanchan (Nigeria)
- Bishop of Kagera (Tanzania)
- Bishop of Kajiado (Kenya)
- Bishop of Kajo Keji (South Sudan)
- Bishop of Kampala (Uganda)
- Bishop of Kano (Nigeria)
- Bishop of Kansas (USA)
- Bishop of Kanyakumari (India)
- Bishop of Kapoeta (South Sudan)
- Bishop of Karachi (Pakistan)
- Bishop of Karamoja (Uganda)
- Bishop of Karimnagar (India)
- Bishop of Karnataka Central (India)
- Bishop of Karnataka North (India)
- Bishop of Karnataka South (India)
- Bishop of Katakwa (Kenya)
- Bishop of Katanga (Congo)
- Bishop of Katsina (Nigeria)
- Bishop of Kebbi (Nigeria)
- Bishop of Keewatin (Canada) - Diocese suppressed, 30 September 2015
- Bishop of Kentucky (USA)
- Kenya - see Archbishops (above)
- Bishop of Kericho (Kenya)
- Bishop of Khartoum (Sudan) - see Archbishops (above)
- Bishop of Kibungo (Rwanda)
- Bishop of Kigali (Rwanda)
- Bishop of Kigeme (Rwanda)
- Bishop of Kigezi (Uganda)
- Bishop of Kilmore, Elphin and Ardagh (Ireland)
- Bishop of Kimberley and Kuruman (South Africa)
- Bishop of Kindu (Congo)
- Bishop of Kinkizi (Uganda)
- Bishop of Kinshasa (Congo)
- Bishop of Kirinyaga (Kenya)
- Bishop of Kisangani (Congo)
- Bishop of Kita Kanto (Japan)
- Bishop of Kitale (Kenya)
- Bishop of Kiteto (Tanzania)
- Bishop of Kitgum (Uganda)
- Bishop of Kitui (Kenya)
- Bishop of Kivu (Rwanda)
- Klerksdorp (South Africa) - see under Matlosane
- Bishop of Kobe (Japan)
- Bishop of Koforidua (Ghana)
- Bishop of Kolhapur (India)
- Bishop of Kondoa (Tanzania)
- Bishop of Kongor (South Sudan)
- Bishop of Kontagora (Nigeria)
- Bishop of Kootenay (Canada)
- Korea - see Archbishops (above)
- Bishop of Krishna-Godavari (India)
- Bishop of Kubwa (Nigeria)
- Bishop of Kuching (Malaysia)
- Bishop of Kumasi (Ghana)
- Bishop of Kumi (Uganda)
- Bishop of Kurunegala (Sri Lanka)
- Bishop of Kushtia (Bangladesh)
- Bishop of Kutigi (Nigeria)
- Kwara (province) - see Archbishops (above)
- Bishop of Kwara (Nigeria)
- Bishop of Kwoi (Nigeria)
- Bishop of Kyoto (Japan)
- Bishop of Kyushu (Japan)

=== L ===
- Labuan - see under Sabah
- Bishop of Lafia (Nigeria)
- Lagos (province) - see Archbishops (above)
- Bishop of Lagos (Nigeria)
- Bishop of Lagos Mainland (Nigeria)
- Bishop of Lagos West (Nigeria)
- Bishop of Lahore (Pakistan)
- Bishop of Lainya (South Sudan)
- Bishop of Lake Malawi (Malawi)
- Bishop of Lake Rukwa (Tanzania)
- Bishop of Lango (Uganda)
- Bishop of Langtang (Nigeria)
- Bishop of Lebombo (Mozambique)
- Bishop of Leeds (England)
- Bishop of Leicester (England)
- Bishop of Lesotho (Kingdom of Lesotho)
- Bishop of Lexington (USA)
- Bishop of Liberia (Liberia)
- Bishop of Lichfield (England)
- Bishop of Limerick and Killaloe (Ireland)
- Bishop of Lincoln (England)
- Lisbon (Portugal) - see under Portugal
- Bishop of Litoral Ecuador (Ecuador)
- Bishop of Liverpool (England)
- Bishop of Liwolo Area (South Sudan)
- Bishop of Llandaff (Wales)
- Lokoja (province) - see Archbishops (above)
- Bishop of Lokoja (Nigeria)
- Diocese of Lomega (South Sudan)
- Bishop of London (England)
- Bishop of Long Island (USA)
- Bishop of Los Angeles (USA)
- Bishop of Louisiana (USA)
- Bishop of Luapula (Zambia)
- Bishop of Lucknow (India)
- Bishop of Lui (South Sudan)
- Bishop of Lusaka (Zambia)
- Bishop of Luwero (Uganda)
- Bishop of Lweru (Tanzania)

=== M ===
- Bishop of Machakos (Kenya)
- Madhya Kerala Diocese (India)
- Bishop of Madi and West Nile (Uganda)
- Madrid - see under Spain
- Bishop of Madurai-Ramnad (India)
- Bishop of Magwi (South Sudan)
- Bishop of Mahajanga (Madagascar)
- Bishop of Maiduguri (Nigeria)
- Bishop of Maine (USA)
- Diocese of Maiwut Area (South Sudan)
- Bishop of Makamba (Burundi)
- Bishop of Makurdi (Nigeria)
- Bishop of Malaita (Solomon Islands)
- Bishop of Malakal (South Sudan)
- Bishop of Malek (South Sudan)
- Bishop of Malek Rup (South Sudan)
- Manawa o Te Wheke - see 'Other Ordinary jurisdictions' (below)
- Bishop of Manchester (England)
- Bishop of Mandalay (Myanmar, formerly Burma)
- Bishop of Manicaland (Zimbabwe)
- Bishop of Maper
- Bishop of Mara (Tanzania)
- Bishop of Marathwada (India)
- Bishop of Maridi (South Sudan)
- Bishop of Maryland (USA)
- Bishop of Masasi (Tanzania)
- Bishop of Maseno North (Kenya)
- Bishop of Maseno South (Kenya)
- Bishop of Maseno West (Kenya)
- Bishop of Mashonaland (Zimbabwe)
- Bishop of Masindi-Kitara (Uganda)
- Bishop of Massachusetts (USA)
- Bishop of Masvingo (Zimbabwe)
- Bishop of Matabeleland (Zimbabwe)
- Bishop of Matana (Burundi)
- Bishop of Matlosane (South Africa)
- Bishop of Mauritius (Mauritius)
- Bishop of Mbaise (Nigeria)
- Bishop of Mbale (Uganda)
- Bishop of Mbamili (Nigeria)
- Bishop of Mbeere (Kenya)
- Bishop of Mbhashe (South Africa)
- Bishop of Meath and Kildare (Ireland)
- Bishop of Medak (India)
- Melanesia - see Archbishops (above)
- Melbourne - see Archbishops (above)
- Bishop of Meru (Kenya)
- Mexico (nation) - see Archbishops (above)
- Bishop of Mexico (Mexico City) (Mexico)
- Bishop of Michigan (USA)
- Bishop of Milwaukee (USA)
- Bishop of Minna (Nigeria)
- Bishop of Minnesota (USA)
- Bishop of Mishamikweesh (Canada)
- Bishop of Mityana (Uganda)
- Bishop of Mississippi (USA)
- Bishop of Missouri (USA)
- Bishop of Mombasa (Kenya)
- Bishop of Monmouth (Wales)
- Bishop of Montana (USA)
- Bishop of Montreal (Canada)
- Bishop of Moosonee (Canada)
- Bishop of Moray, Ross and Caithness (Scotland)
- Bishop of Morobo (South Sudan)
- Bishop of Morogoro (Tanzania)
- Bishop of Mount Kenya Central (Kenya)
- Bishop of Mount Kenya South (Kenya)
- Bishop of Mount Kenya West (Kenya)
- Bishop of Mount Kilimanjaro (Tanzania)
- Bishop of Mpumalanga (South Africa)
- Bishop of Mpwapwa (Tanzania)
- Bishop of Mthatha (South Africa)
- Bishop of Muhabura (Uganda)
- Bishop of Mukono (Uganda)
- Bishop of Multan (Pakistan)
- Bishop of Mumbai (India)
- Bishop of Mumias (Kenya)
- Bishop of Mundri (South Sudan)
- Bishop of Mundri
- Bishop of Mundu Area
- Bishop of Murang'a South (Kenya)
- Bishop of the Murray (Australia)
- Anglican Bishop of Muyinga (Burundi)
- Myanmar (Burma) - see Archbishops (above)
- Bishop of Myitkyina (Myanmar, formerly Burma)

=== N ===
- Bishop of Nagpur (India)
- Bishop of Nairobi (Kenya)
- Bishop of Nakuru (Kenya)
- Bishop of Nambale (Kenya)
- Bishop of Namibia (Namibia)
- Bishop of Namirembe (Uganda)
- Bishop of Nampula (Mozambique)
- Bishop of Nandyal (India)
- Bishop of Nasik (India)
- Bishop of Nasir (South Sudan)
- Bishop of Nassau and the Bahamas (Nassau)
- Bishop of Natal (South Africa)
- Bishop of Ndokwa (Nigeria)
- Bishop of Nebbi (Uganda)
- Bishop of Nebraska (USA)
- Bishop of Nelson (New Zealand)
- Bishop of Nevada (USA)
- Bishop of New Bussa (Nigeria)
- Bishop of the New Guinea Islands (Papua New Guinea)
- Bishop of New Hampshire (USA)
- Bishop of New Jersey (USA)
- Bishop of New Westminster (Canada)
- Bishop of New York (USA)
- Bishop of Newala (Tanzania)
- Bishop of Newark (USA)
- Bishop of Newcastle (England)
- Bishop of Newcastle (Australia)
- Bishop of Ngbo (Nigeria)
- Bishop of Niagara (Canada)
- Bishop of Niassa (Mozambique)
- Bishop of Nicaragua (Nicaragua)
- Niger (province) - see Archbishops (above)
- Niger Delta (province) - see Archbishops (above)
- Bishop On The Niger (Nigeria)
- Bishop of Niger Delta (Nigeria)
- Bishop of Niger Delta North (Nigeria)
- Bishop of Niger Delta West (Nigeria)
- Bishop of Niger West (Nigeria)
- All Nigeria - see Archbishops (above)
- Bishop of Nike (Nigeria)
- Bishop of Nimule Area (South Sudan)
- Bishop of Nnewi (Nigeria)
- Bishop of Nord Kivu (Congo)
- Bishop of North Africa (Libya, Algeria, Tunisia)
- Bishop of North Ankole (Uganda)
- Bishop of North Carolina (USA)
- Bishop of North Central Philippines (Philippines)
- Bishop of North Dakota (USA)
- Bishop of North East India (India)
- Bishop of North Eastern Caribbean and Aruba (Antigua, Aruba, etc.)
- Bishop of North Karamoja (Uganda)
- Bishop of North Kerala (India)
- Bishop of North Kigezi (Uganda)
- Bishop of North Mbale (Uganda)
- Bishop of North Queensland (Australia)
- Bishop of North West Australia (Australia)
- Bishop of Northern Argentina (Argentina)
- Bishop of Northern California (USA)
- Bishop of Northern Indiana (USA)
- Bishop of Northern Izon (Nigeria)
- Bishop of Northern Luzon (Philippines)
- Bishop of Northern Malawi (Malawi)
- Bishop of Northern Mexico (Mexico)
- Bishop of Northern Michigan (USA)
- Bishop of Northern Philippines (Philippines)
- Bishop of the Northern Territory (Australia)
- Bishop of Northern Uganda (Uganda)
- Bishop of Northern Zambia (Zambia)
- Bishop of Northwest Texas (USA)
- Bishop of Northwestern Pennsylvania (USA)
- Bishop of Norwich (England)
- Bishop of Nova Scotia and Prince Edward Island (Canada)
- Bishop of Nsukka (Nigeria)
- Bishop of Nyahururu (Kenya)
- Bishop of Nyang (South Sudan)
- Bishop of Nzara (South Sudan)

=== O ===
- Bishop of Offa (Nigeria)
- Bishop of Ogbaru (Nigeria)
- Bishop of Ogbia (Nigeria)
- Bishop of Ogbomoso (Nigeria)
- Bishop of Ogoni (Nigeria)
- Bishop of Ogori-Magongo (Nigeria)
- Bishop of Ohaji/Egbema (Nigeria)
- Bishop of Ohio (USA)
- Bishop of Oji River (Nigeria)
- Bishop of Oke-Ogun (Nigeria)
- Bishop of Oke-Osun (Nigeria)
- Bishop of Okene (Nigeria)
- Bishop of Okigwe (Nigeria)
- Bishop of Okigwe North (Nigeria)
- Bishop of Okigwe South (Nigeria)
- Bishop of Okinawa (Japan)
- Bishop of Oklahoma (USA)
- Bishop of Okrika (Nigeria)
- Bishop of Oleh (Nigeria)
- Bishop of Olo (South Sudan)
- Bishop of Olympia (USA)
- Bishop of Omu-Aran (Nigeria)
- Ondo (province) - see Archbishops (above)
- Bishop of Ondo (Nigeria)
- Bishop of Ontario (Canada)
- Bishop of Oregon (USA)
- Bishop of Orlu (Nigeria)
- Bishop of Oru (Nigeria)
- Bishop of Osaka (Japan)
- Bishop of Osun (Nigeria)
- Bishop of Osun North East (Nigeria)
- Bishop of Ottawa (Canada)
- Bishop of Otukpo (Nigeria)
- Owerri (province) - see Archbishops (above)
- Bishop of Owerri (Nigeria)
- Bishop of Owo (Nigeria)
- Bishop of Oxford (England)
- Bishop of Oyo (Nigeria)

=== P ===
- Bishop of Pacong (South Sudan)
- Pakistan - see Archbishops (above)
- Bishop of Panama (Panama)
- Bishop of Pankshin (Nigeria)
- Bishop of Panrieng (South Sudan)
- Bishop of Panyana Area (South Sudan)
- Papua New Guinea - see Archbishops (above)
- Bishop of Paraguay (Paraguay)
- Bishop of Patna (India)
- Bishop of Pelotas (Brazil)
- Bishop of Pennsylvania (USA)
- Persia - see under Iran
- Perth (Australia) - see Archbishops (above)
- Bishop of Peru (Peru)
- Bishop of Peshawar (Pakistan)
- Bishop of Peterborough (England)
- Philippines - see Archbishops (above)
- Bishop of Phulbani (India)
- Bishop of Pittsburgh (USA)
- The Platte - see under Nebraska
- Bishop of Polynesia (Polynesian island nations and Fiji)
- Bishop of Popondota (Papua New Guinea)
- Bishop of Port Elizabeth (South Africa)
- Bishop of Port Moresby (Papua New Guinea)
- Bishop of Port Sudan (Sudan)
- Bishop of Portsmouth (England)
- Bishop of Portugal (Lusitanian Church)
- Bishop of Pretoria (South Africa)
- Bishop of Puerto Rico (Puerto Rico)
- Bishop of Pune (India)

=== Q ===
- Bishop of Qu'Appelle (Canada)
- Bishop of Quebec (Canada)
- Bishop of Quincy (USA)

=== R ===
- Bishop of Raiwind (Pakistan)
- Bishop of Rajasthan (India)
- Bishop of Rayalaseema (India)
- Bishop of Recife (Brazil)
- Bishop of Rejaf (South Sudan)
- Bishop of Remo (Nigeria)
- Bishop of Renk (South Sudan)
- Bishop of Rhode Island (USA)
- Bishop of the Rift Valley (Tanzania)
- Bishop of Rio de Janeiro (Brazil)
- Bishop of the Rio Grande (USA)
- Bishop of Ripon (England) - no longer a diocesan bishop
- Bishop of Ripon and Leeds (England) diocese suppressed 2014
- Bishop of Riverina (Australia)
- Bishop of Rochester (England)
- Bishop of Rochester (USA)
- Bishop of Rockhampton (Australia)
- Bishop of Rokon (South Sudan)
- Bishop of Rorya (Tanzania)
- Bishop of Rumbek (South Sudan)
- Bishop of Rupert's Land (Canada)
- Anglican Bishop of Rutana (Burundi)
- Bishop of Ruvuma (Tanzania)
- Bishop of Ruwenzori (Uganda)
- Rwanda - see Archbishops (above)

=== S ===
- Bishop of Sabah (Malaysia)
- Bishop of Sabongidda-Ora (Nigeria)
- Bishop of St Albans (England)
- Bishop of St Andrews, Dunkeld and Dunblane (Scotland)
- Bishop of St Asaph (Wales)
- Bishop of St David's (Wales)
- Bishop of St Edmundsbury and Ipswich (England)
- Bishop of St Helena (St Helena)
- Bishop of St Mark the Evangelist (South Africa)
- Bishop of St John's (South Africa) - see under Mthatha
- Bishop of Saldanha Bay (South Africa)
- Bishop of Salisbury (England)
- Bishop of Sambalpur (India)
- Bishop of San Diego (USA)
- Bishop of San Joaquin (USA)
- Bishop of Santiago (Chile)
- Bishop of Santiago (Philippines)
- Bishop of Sapele (Nigeria)
- Bishop of Saskatchewan (Canada)
- Bishop of Saskatoon (Canada)
- Bishop of São Paulo (Brazil)
- Scotland (Primus) - see Archbishops (above)
- Bishop of Sebei (Uganda)
- Bishop of Sekondi (Ghana)
- Bishop of Seoul (Korea)
- Bishop of Seychelles (Seychelles)
- Bishop of Sheffield (England)
- Bishop of Shinyanga (Tanzania)
- Bishop of Shyira (Rwanda)
- Bishop of Shyogwe (Rwanda)
- Bishop of Sialkot (Pakistan)
- Bishop of Singapore (Singapore)
- Bishop of Sittwe (Myanmar, formerly Burma)
- Bishop of Sodor and Man (Isle of Man)
- Bishop of Sokoto (Nigeria)
- Bishop of Soroti (Uganda)
- Bishop of South Ankole (Uganda)
- Bishop of South Carolina (USA)
- Bishop of South Dakota (USA)
- South East Asia - see Archbishops (above)
- Bishop of South Kerala (India)
- Bishop of South Ruwenzori (Uganda)
- Bishop of South West Tanganyika (Tanzania)
- Bishop of South Western Brazil (Brazil)
- Bishop of Southeast Florida (USA)
- Bishop of Southeastern Mexico (Mexico)
- Bishop of Southern Brazil (Brazil)
- Southern Cone of America- see Archbishops (above)
- Bishop of the Southern Highlands (Tanzania)
- Bishop of Southern Malawi (Malawi)
- Bishop of Southern Nyanza (Kenya)
- Bishop of Southern Ohio (USA)
- Bishop of Southern Philippines (Philippines)
- Bishop of Southern Virginia (USA)
- Bishop of Southwark (Anglican) (England)
- Bishop of Southwell and Nottingham (England)
- Bishop of Southwest Florida (USA)
- Bishop of Southwestern Virginia (USA)
- Bishop of Spain (Spanish Reformed Episcopal Church)
- Bishop of Spokane (USA)
- Bishop of Springfield (USA)
- Sudan - see Archbishops (above)
- Bishop of Sunyani (Ghana)
- Bishop of Swansea and Brecon (Wales)
- Bishop of Swaziland (Swaziland)
- Sydney - see Archbishops (above)

=== T ===
- Bishop of Tabora (Tanzania)
- Bishop of Taejon, Korea (Korea)
- Bishop of Taita-Taveta (Kenya)
- Bishop of Taiwan (Taiwan)
- Bishop of Tamale (Ghana)
- Bishop of Tanga (Tanzania)
- Tanzania - see Archbishops (above)
- Bishop of Tarime (Tanzania)
- Bishop of Tasmania (Australia)
- Bishop of Temotu (Solomon Islands)
- Anglican Bishop of Temuco (Chile)
- Bishop of Tennessee (USA)
- Te Pīhopatanga o Aotearoa - see 'Other Ordinary jurisdictions' (below)
- Bishop of Terekeka (South Sudan)
- Bishop of Texas (USA)
- Titles beginning with 'the' - see under initial of next word
- Bishop of Tgoothukudi - Navareth (India)
- Bishop of Thika (Kenya)
- Bishop of Tirunelveli (India)
- Bishop of Toamasina (Madagascar)
- Bishop of Tohoku (Japan)
- Bishop of Tokyo (Japan)
- Bishop of Tonj (South Sudan)
- Bishop of Torit (South Sudan)
- Bishop of Toronto (Canada)
- Bishop of Toungoo (Myanmar, formerly Burma)
- Bishop of Trichy-Tanjore (India)
- Bishop of Trinidad and Tobago (Trinidad and Tobago)
- Bishop of Truro (England)
- Bishop of Tuam, Killala and Achonry (Ireland)
- Bishop of Twik East (South Sudan)

=== U ===
- Bishop of Udi (Nigeria)
- Uganda - see Archbishops (above)
- Bishop of Ughelli (Nigeria)
- Bishop of Ukhahlamba (South Africa)
- Bishop of Ukwa (Nigeria)
- Bishop of Umuahia (Nigeria)
- Bishop of Umzimvubu (South Africa)
- Bishop of Upper Shire (Malawi)
- Bishop of Upper South Carolina (USA)
- Bishop of Uruguay (Uruguay)
- Bishop of Utah (USA)
- Bishop of Uyo (Nigeria)

=== V ===
- Anglican Bishop of Valparaíso (Chile)
- Bishop of Vanuatu (Vanuatu)
- Bishop of Vellore (India)
- Bishop of Venezuela (Venezuela)
- Bishop of Vermont (USA)
- Bishop of Victoria Nyanza (Tanzania)
- Bishop of the Virgin Islands (Virgin Islands)
- Bishop of Virginia (USA)

=== W ===
- Bishop of Wad Medani (Sudan)
- Bishop of Waiapu (New Zealand)
- Bishop of Waikato (New Zealand)
- Wales - see Archbishops (above)
- Bishop of Wandi
- Bishop of Wangaratta (Australia)
- Bishop of Wanglei Area (South Sudan)
- Bishop of Warri (Nigeria)
- Bishop of Washington (USA)
- Bishop of Wau (South Sudan)
- Bishop of Wellington (New Zealand)
- Bishop of Wernyol (South Sudan)
- West Africa - see Archbishops (above)
- Bishop of West Ankole (Uganda)
- Bishop of West Buganda (Uganda)
- West Indies - see Archbishops (above)
- Bishop of West Malaysia (West Malaysia)
- Bishop of West Missouri (USA)
- Bishop of West Tennessee (USA)
- Bishop of West Texas (USA)
- Bishop of West Virginia (USA)
- Bishop of Western China (Republican China)
- Bishop of Western Izon (Nigeria)
- Bishop of Western Kansas (USA)
- Bishop of the Diocese of Western Kowloon (Hong Kong)
- Bishop of Western Louisiana (USA)
- Bishop of Western Massachusetts (USA)
- Bishop of Western Mexico (Mexico)
- Bishop of Western Michigan (USA)
- Bishop of Western New York (USA)
- Bishop of Western Newfoundland (Canada)
- Bishop of Western North Carolina (USA)
- Bishop of Western Tanganyika (Tanzania)
- Bishop of Wiawso (Ghana)
- Bishop of Willochra (Australia)
- Bishop of Winchester (England)
- Bishop of the Windward Islands (Assorted Windward Islands nations)
- Bishop of Wondurba (South Sudan)
- Bishop of Worcester (England)
- Bishop of Wulu (South Sudan)
- Bishop of Wusasa (Nigeria)
- Bishop of Wyoming (USA)

=== X Y ===
- Bishop of Yambio (South Sudan)
- Bishop of Yangon (Myanmar, formerly Burma)
- Bishop of Yei (South Sudan)
- Bishop of Yeri (South Sudan)
- Bishop of Yewa (Nigeria)
- Bishop of Yirol (South Sudan)
- Bishop of Yokohama (Japan)
- Bishop of Yola (Nigeria)
- York - see Archbishops (above)
- Bishop of Yukon (Canada)
- Bishop of Ysabel (Solomon Islands)

=== Z ===
- Bishop of Zaki-Biam (Nigeria)
- Bishop of Zanzibar (Tanzanian Republic of Zanzibar)
- Bishop of Zaria (Nigeria)
- Bishop of Zonkwa (Nigeria)
- Bishop of Zululand (Zululand)

== Other Ordinary jurisdictions ==
A list of bishops holding actual Ordinary jurisdiction, or delegated Ordinary jurisdiction, but not having a diocese.

=== Military Ordinariates ===
- Bishop Ordinary of the Anglican Military Ordinariate (Canada)
- Bishop of the Episcopate of the Armed Forces (Kenya)
- Bishop to the Forces (United Kingdom) (Delegated jurisdiction from the Archbishop of Canterbury.) Currently held by the Archbishop's chief of staff the Bishop at Lambeth.
- Bishop for Federal Ministries (USA) (Delegated jurisdiction for federal military, medical, and prisons personnel, chaplains, and communities)

=== Ethnic Ordinariates ===
- National Indigenous Anglican Archbishop (Canada)
- Bishop of the Navajoland Area Mission (Navajo Nation, USA)
- Bishop of/Pīhopa o Te Manawa o Te Wheke (New Zealand) (A personal prelature in central North Island, for clergy and laity of Māori ethnicity)
- Bishop of/Pīhopa o Te Tai Tokerau (New Zealand) (A personal prelature in the northern region, for clergy and laity of Māori ethnicity)
- Bishop of/Pīhopa o Te Tairāwhiti (New Zealand) (A personal prelature in the east coast region, for clergy and laity of Māori ethnicity)
- Bishop of/Pīhopa o Te Upoko o Te Ika (New Zealand) (A personal prelature in and around Wellington, for clergy and laity of Māori ethnicity)
- Bishop of/Pīhopa o Te Waipounamu (New Zealand) (A personal prelature in the South Island, for clergy and laity of Māori ethnicity)

=== Other Ordinariates ===
- Bishop of Dover, permanently delegated ordinary authority (save a few reserved matters) within the Diocese of Canterbury and sometimes called "Bishop in Canterbury"
- Bishop of the Convocation of American Churches in Europe, bishop-in-charge on behalf of the ordinary, the Presiding Bishop (TEC)
- Bishop of the Missionary District of Oeste-Brasil (Brazil)
- Bishop for the Falkland Islands, bishop-in-charge with delegated jurisdiction from the Archbishop of Canterbury, who is ex officio Bishop of the Falkland Islands. Currently held by the Archbishop's chief of staff the Bishop at Lambeth.
- Bishop for the Territory of the People, a suffragan bishop-in-charge of a jurisdiction in Canada which has been granted the legal status of a diocese, but without being incorporated as a diocese. It shares the same territorial area as the former Diocese of Cariboo.

Additionally there are two bishops who hold primatial appointments without being also a diocesan bishop. Both of these hold a measure of Ordinary jurisdiction, but are already shown in the list of 'Archbishops' (above).

- Archbishop Primate of Canada (holds Ordinary and Primatial authority)
- Presiding Bishop of the Episcopal Church, USA (holds Ordinary, Metropolitical, and Primatial authority)

== Historical succession ==
- Canterbury 597
  - Rochester 604
    - St Albans 1876
      - Chelmsford 1914
    - Southwark 1905
  - London 604
    - Westminster 1540-50
    - Nova Scotia 1787 → Nova Scotia & Prince Edward Island 1999
      - Quebec 1793
        - Toronto 1839
          - Huron 1857
          - Ontario 1862
            - Ottawa 1896
          - Algoma 1873
          - Niagara 1875
        - Rupert's Land 1849
          - British Columbia 1859
            - Caledonia 1879
            - New Westminster 1879
              - Kootenay 1899
              - Cariboo 1914 → Territory of the People 2002
          - Moosonee 1872
          - Athabasca 1874
            - Mackenzie River 1883 → Arctic 1933
              - Selkirk 1891 → Yukon 1907
          - Saskatchewan 1874
            - Calgary 1888
              - Edmonton 1913
            - Saskatoon 1933
          - Qu'Appelle 1884
          - Keewatin 1902-2015
            - Mishamikoweesh 2014
          - Brandon 1913
        - Montreal 1850
      - Barbados 1824
        - Antigua & the Leeward Islands 1842 → North East Caribbean & Aruba
      - Jamaica 1824
        - Nassau 1861
      - Newfoundland 1839 → Eastern Newfoundland & Labrador 1976
        - Bermuda 1879
        - Central Newfoundland 1976
        - Western Newfoundland 1976
      - Fredericton 1845
    - Calcutta 1814
      - Madras 1835
        - Colombo 1845
          - Mauritius 1854
            - Madagascar 1874 → Antananarivo 1969
              - Tamatave 1969 → Toamasina
              - Antsiranana
              - Fianarantsoa 2003
              - Mahajanga 2003
              - Toliara 2013
            - Seychelles 1973
          - Kurunegala 1950
      - Australia 1836 → Sydney 1847
        - Tasmania 1842
        - Adelaide 1847
          - Perth 1856
            - Bunbury 1904
              - Northern Australia 1910 → North West Australia 1961
            - Kalgoorlie 1914-1973
          - Willochra 1915
          - The Murray 1970
        - Melbourne 1847
          - Ballarat 1875
            - St Arnaud 1926-1976
          - Bendigo 1902
          - Gippsland 1902
          - Wangaratta 1902
        - Newcastle 1847
          - Brisbane 1858
            - Rockhampton 1892
            - New Guinea 1898 → Dogura 1977
              - Southern Papua 1977 → Port Moresby
              - Popondota 1977
              - Aipo Rongo 1977
              - New Guinea Islands 1977
          - Grafton & Armidale 1863 → Armidale 1914
            - Grafton 1914
        - Goulburn 1863 → Canberra & Goulburn 1950
          - Riverina 1884
        - Bathurst 1870
        - North Queensland 1879
          - Carpentaria 1900-1996
            - Northern Territory 1968
      - Bombay 1837
        - Nasik 1929
      - Cape Town 1847
        - Grahamstown 1853
          - St John's 1872 → Mthatha 2006
            - Mbhashe 2010
            - Umzimvubu 2011
          - Port Elizabeth 1970
          - Ukhahlamba 2009
        - Natal 1853
          - Zululand 1870
        - St Helena 1859
          - Falkland Islands 1869
            - Argentina & Eastern South America 1910-1946, 1963
              - Northern Argentina 1969
              - Paraguay 1973
              - Uruguay 1988
            - Chile, Bolivia & Peru 1963 → Chile & Bolivia → Santiago 1981
              - Peru 1977
              - Bolivia 1996
              - Araucania 2018
              - South of Chile 2018
              - Valparaiso 2018
        - Bloemfontein 1863 → Free State 2003
          - Pretoria 1878
            - Johannesburg 1922
              - Christ the King 1990
              - Matlosane 1990
              - South Eastern Transvaal 1990 → Highveld
            - St Mark the Evangelist 1987
            - Mpumalanga 2004
          - Mashonaland 1891 → Southern Rhodesia 1915 → Mashonaland 1952 → Harare
            - Central Zimbabwe 1971
            - Manicaland 1981
            - Masvingo
          - Kimberley & Kuruman 1911
          - Basutoland 1950 → Lesotho 1966
          - Matabeleland 1952
            - Botswana 1972
        - Nyasaland 1892 → Malawi 1964 → Lake Malawi 1971
          - Southern Malawi 1971
            - Upper Shire 2002
          - Northern Malawi 1995
        - Lebombo 1893
          - Niassa 1979
            - Nampula 2019
            - Zambesia 2021
            - Tete 2022
          - Angola 2003 → Good Shepherd 2021
            - Christ the King 2021
            - Central & South Angola 2021
            - Divine Hope 2021
          - Pungue River 2021
          - Maciene 2022
          - Inhambane 2022
        - Northern Rhodesia 1910 → Lusaka 1971
          - Central Zambia 1971
          - Northern Zambia 1971
          - Eastern Zambia
          - Luapula
        - George 1911
        - Damaraland 1924 → Namibia
        - Swaziland 1968 → Eswatini 2018
        - Saldanha Bay 2005
        - False Bay 2005
      - Labuan 1855
      - Rangoon 1877 → Yangon 1989
        - Mandalay 1970
          - Myitkyina 1990
        - Hpa-an 1978
          - Toungoo 1994
        - Sittwe 1990
      - Chotanagpur 1890
        - Nagpur 1903
      - Lucknow 1893
      - Assam 1915 → North East India
      - East Bengal 1956 → Dhaka 1971
        - Kushtia 1990
        - Barisal 2017
    - Jerusalem 1841
      - Persia 1912 → Iran
      - Egypt & the Sudan 1920 → Sudan 1945
        - Egypt 1945
          - North Africa 2020
          - Horn of Africa 2020
          - Gambella 2020
      - Cyprus & the Fulf 1976
    - New Zealand 1841 → Auckland 1869
      - Christchurch 1856
      - Nelson 1858
      - Waiapu 1858
      - Wellington 1858
    - Gibraltar 1842
    - Guyana 1842
    - Victoria 1849 → Hong Kong & Macao 1951 → Hong Kong 1998
      - Hong Kong Island 1998
      - Western Kowloon 1998
      - Eastern Kowloon 1998
    - Sierra Leone 1852 → Freetown 1981
      - Bo 1981
  - York 625
  - Norwich 630
  - Winchester 634
    - Chichester 681
    - Sherborne 705 → Sarum 1075
      - Crediton 909 → Exeter 1050
        - Truro 1876
      - Ramsbury 909-1058
      - Wells 909 → Bath 1090 → Bath and Wells 1245
    - Guildford 1927
    - Portsmouth 1927
  - Lindisfarne 635 → Chester-le-Street 875 → Durham 995
    - Carlisle 1133
    - Newcastle 1882
  - Lichfield 656 → Chester 1075 → Coventry 1102 → Lichfield & Coventry 1228 → Lichfield 1837
    - Hereford 676
    - Lindsey 678-1010
    - Worcester 680
      - Gloucester 1541 → Gloucester & Bristol 1836-1897 → Gloucester 1897
      - Bristol 1542-1836, 1897
      - Birmingham 1905
      - Coventry 1918
    - Lincoln 681 → Dorchester 878 → Lincoln 1072
      - Ely 1108
        - St Edmundsbury & Ipswich 1914
      - Peterborough 1541
        - Leicester 1926
      - Oxford 1542
      - Southwell 1884 → Southwell & Nottingham 2005
  - The Niger 1864 → Western Equatorial Africa 1891 → The Niger 1920
    - Lagos 1920
      - Ibadan 1952
      - Ondo-Benin 1952
      - Northern Nigeria 1952
    - Niger Delta 1946
  - Equatorial Africa
    - Accra 1909
  - Eastern Equatorial Africa 1884 → Uganda 1898 → Namirembe 1960
    - Mombasa 1898
    - Upper Nile 1926 → Mbale 1961
      - Soroti 1961
      - Northern Uganda 1961
    - West Buganda 1960
      - Mityana 1977
      - Central Buganda 1995
    - Ankole-Kigezi 1960 → Ankole 1967 → East Ankole 1977 → Ankole 2003
      - Kigezi 1967
        - North Kigezi 1981
          - Kinkiizi 1995
        - Muhabura 1990
      - West Ankole 1977
      - North Ankole 2003
      - South Ankole 2012
      - Northwest Ankole 2017
    - Ruanda-Urundi 1960 → Burundi 1966 → Buye 1978
      - Rwanda 1966 → Kigali
      - Bujumbura 1975
        - Rumonge
      - Gitega 1985
      - Matana 1990
      - Makamba 1997
      - Muyinga 2005
    - Rwenzori 1960
      - Bunyoro-Kitara 1972
        - Masindi-Kitara 2004
      - South Ruwenzori 1984
      - East Ruwenzori 2009
    - Kampala 1972
    - Mukono 1983
    - Luweero 1991
  - Joseon 1889 → Seoul 1965
    - Daejeon 1965
      - Busan 1974
- Connecticut 1785
  - Eastern 1811 → Massachusetts 1843
    - Vermont 1832
    - New Hampshire 1832
    - Rhode Island 1843
    - Maine 1843
    - Western Massachusetts 1901
- Pennsylvania 1785
  - Pittsburgh 1865
    - Erie → Northwestern Pennsylvania 1910
  - Central Pennsylvania 1871 → Bethlehem 1909
    - Harrisburg 1904 → Central Pennsylvania 1971
- Virginia 1785
  - West Virginia 1877
  - Southern Virginia 1892
    - Southwestern Virginia 1918
- New York 1785
  - Western New York 1837
    - Rochester 1931
  - Albany 1868
  - Central New York 1868
  - Long Island 1868
- Maryland 1785
  - Easton 1868
  - Washington 1895
- New Jersey 1785
  - Northern New Jersey 1874 → Newark 1886
- Delaware 1785
- South Carolina 1785
  - Upper South Carolina 1922
- Episcopal Church
  - North Carolina 1817
    - East Carolina 1883
    - Western North Carolina 1922
  - Ohio 1818
    - Southern Ohio 1875
  - Georgia 1823
    - Atlanta 1907
  - Mississippi 1826
  - Kentucky 1829
    - Lexington 1895
  - Tennessee 1829
    - West Tennessee 1982
    - East Tennessee 1985
  - Alabama 1830
    - Central Gulf Coast 1970
  - Illinois 1835 → Chicago 1877
    - Quincy 1877-2013
    - Springfield 1877
  - Michigan 1836
    - Western Michigan 1875 → Great Lakes 2024
    - Marquette 1895 → Northern Michigan
    - Eastern Michigan 1995-2024
  - Florida 1838
    - South Florida 1922 → Central Florida 1969
      - Southeast Florida 1969
      - Southwest Florida 1969
  - Louisiana 1838
  - Missouri 1841
  - Indiana 1849 → Indianapolis 1898
    - Northern Indiana 1898
  - Texas 1849
    - Dallas 1895
      - North Texas 1982-2022
  - Wisconsin 1854 → Milwaukee 1886 → Wisconsin 2024
    - Fond du Lac 1875-2024
    - Eau Claire 1928-2024
  - Minnesota 1857
    - Duluth 1907-1944
  - Convocation of Episcopal Churches in Europe 1859
  - Haiti 1864
  - Cuba 1901
  - Puerto Rico 1902
    - Virgin Islands 1963

== See also ==
- List of Catholic dioceses (structured view)
- List of Catholic dioceses (alphabetical)
- List of Eastern Orthodox dioceses and archdioceses
- List of Lutheran dioceses and archdioceses
- Patriarch
- List of current patriarchs
