= List of bishops in the Church of Nigeria in 2000 =

List of Anglican bishops in Nigeria

This is a list of the archbishops and bishops in the Church of Nigeria, Anglican Communion, in post in 2000.

In 2000, the church had three provinces in Nigeria, each with an archbishop. Each province is divided into dioceses; there were 76 dioceses in Nigeria, each with a bishop. Each archbishop is also the bishop of one of the dioceses in his province.

The pre-eminent archbishop, The Primate of All Nigeria, is chosen from the archbishops, and becomes Bishop of Abuja.

The primate in 2000 was Peter Akinola, who served from 2000 to 2010.

== Archbishops ==
1. Ephraim Adebola Ademowo was the Anglican archbishop of Province One in 2000.
2. Jonathan Onyemelukwe was the Anglican archbishop of Province Two in 2000.
3. Peter Akinola was the Anglican archbishop of Province Three in 2000.

== Bishops of Dioceses ==
1. Samuel Adedayo Abe was the Anglican Bishop of Ekiti in Province One of the Church of Nigeria in 2000.
2. Peter Awelewa Adebiyi was the Anglican Bishop of Lagos West in Province One of the Church of Nigeria in 2000.
3. Tunde Adeleye was the Anglican Bishop of Calabar in Province Two of the Church of Nigeria in 2000.
4. Ephraim Ademowo was the Anglican Bishop of Lagos in Province One of the Church of Nigeria in 2000.
5. Tanimu Aduda was the Anglican Bishop of Gwagwalada in Province Three of the Church of Nigeria in 2000.
6. Albert Aduloju Agbaje was the Anglican Bishop of Sabongidda-Ora in Province One of the Church of Nigeria in 2000.
7. Jacob Ajetunmobi was the Anglican Bishop of Ibadan South in Province One of the Church of Nigeria in 2000.
8. Edmund Akanya was the Anglican Bishop of Kebbi in Province Three of the Church of Nigeria in 2000.
9. Gabriel Akinbolarin Akinbiyi was the Anglican Bishop of Offa in Province One of the Church of Nigeria in 2000.
10. Joseph Akinfenwa was the Anglican Bishop of Sokoto in Province Three of the Church of Nigeria in 2000.
11. Peter Akinola was the Anglican Bishop of Abuja in Province Three of the Church of Nigeria in 2000.
12. Michael Akinyemi was the Anglican Bishop of Igbomina in Province One of the Church of Nigeria in 2000.
13. Adolphus A. Amabebe was the Anglican Bishop of Niger Delta West in Province Two of the Church of Nigeria in 2000.
14. Maxwell Anikwenwa was the Anglican Bishop of Awka in Province Two of the Church of Nigeria in 2000.
15. Joseph Oluwafemi Arulefela was the Anglican Bishop of Ikale-Ilaje in Province One of the Church of Nigeria in 2000. Arulefela was consecrated as Bishop of Ikale-Ilaje on 25 January 1999.
16. George Bako was the Anglican Bishop of Lokoja in Province One of the Church of Nigeria in 2000.
17. Simon Bala was the Anglican Bishop of Gusau in Province Three of the Church of Nigeria in 2000.
18. Timothy Ipadeola Olaniyi Bolaji was the Anglican Bishop of Yewa in Province One of the Church of Nigeria in 2000. He was the first Bishop of Egbado (now Yewa) Diocese, enthroned on 2 November 1990, at the Cathedral Church of Christ, Ilaro.
19. Emmanuel Chukwuma was the Anglican Bishop of Enugu in Province Two of the Church of Nigeria in 2000.
20. William Weh Diya was the Anglican Bishop of Kafanchan in Province Three of the Church of Nigeria in 2000.
21. Godson Chinyere Echefu was the Anglican Bishop of Ideato in Province Two of the Church of Nigeria in 2000. He was consecrated Bishop of Ideato at Christ Church, Uwari, Enugu, on 11 July 1999 by Abiodun Adetiloye, Primate of the Church of Nigeria, a post he held until his retirement in 2004. Echefu was born in Nkwerre on 25 March 1934, and died in early 2021.
22. Jonathan Edewor was the Anglican Bishop of Oleh in Province Two of the Church of Nigeria in 2000.
23. Christian Efobi was the Anglican Bishop of Yola in Province Three of the Church of Nigeria in 2000.
24. Samuel Onyuku Elenwo was the Anglican Bishop of Niger Delta North in Province Two of the Church of Nigeria in 2000.
25. Nathaniel A Enuku was the Anglican Bishop of Warri in Province One of the Church of Nigeria in 2000. Enuku was the second bishop of Warri from April 1992 until March 2003.
26. Laudamus Atushiaka Ereaku (born 13 January 1953) was the Anglican Bishop of Bauchi in Province Three of the Church of Nigeria in 2000. Ereaku died on 12 December 2005 in a road accident in Bauchi State. He was ordained priest in 1986, Canon in 1990, Archdeacon in 1992 and elected Bishop of Bauchi in 1998, succeeding Emmanuel Chukwuma.
27. Ugochukwu Ezuoke was the Anglican Bishop of Umuahia in Province Two of the Church of Nigeria in 2000.
28. Jeremiah Olagbamigbe A Fabuluje was the Anglican Bishop of Kwara in Province One of the Church of Nigeria in 2000. Fabuluje retired as Bishop of Kwara in 2005. He died in 2008. His son Oluwagbemiro Fabuluje is also a bishop.
29. Seth Oni Fagbemi was the Anglican Bishop of Osun in Province One of the Church of Nigeria in 2000. He was enthroned at All Saints’ Cathedral, Balogun, Osogbo, as the pioneer bishop of the Diocese of Osun, which was inaugurated on 3 August 1987. He retired as bishop in 2000.
30. Nathaniel Fasogbon was the Anglican Bishop of Oke-Osun in Province One of the Church of Nigeria in 2000.
31. Emmanuel Bolanie Gbonigi was the Anglican Bishop of Akure in Province One of the Church of Nigeria in 2000. Gbonigi was born in 1931. He was the pioneer Bishop of Akure, a position he occupied from 1983 until his retirement in 2000.
32. Josiah Idowu-Fearon was the Anglican Bishop of Kaduna in Province Three of the Church of Nigeria in 2000.
33. Emmanuel Iheagwam was the Anglican Bishop of Egbu in Province Two of the Church of Nigeria in 2000.
34. Jonah Ilonuba was the Anglican Bishop of Nsukka in Province Two of the Church of Nigeria in 2000.
35. Nathan Inyom was the Anglican Bishop of Makurdi in Province Three of the Church of Nigeria in 2000.
36. Augustine Onyeyrichukwu Iwuagwu was the Anglican Bishop of Aba in Province Two of the Church of Nigeria in 2000. He was consecrated Bishop of Aba in 1987.
37. Jonah Kolo was the Anglican Bishop of Bida in Province Three of the Church of Nigeria in 2000.
38. Benjamin Kwashi was the Anglican Bishop of Jos in Province Three of the Church of Nigeria in 2000.
39. James S Sekari Kwasu was the Anglican Bishop of Katsina in Province Three of the Church of Nigeria in 2000.
40. Ali Buba Lamido was the Anglican Bishop of Wusasa in Province Three of the Church of Nigeria in 2000.
41. George Latunji Lasebikan was the Anglican Bishop of Ondo in Province One of the Church of Nigeria in 2000.
42. Yesufu Lumu was the Anglican Bishop of Dutse in Province Three of the Church of Nigeria in 2000.
43. Amos Madu was the Anglican Bishop of Oji in Province Two of the Church of Nigeria in 2000.
44. Caleb Anny Maduoma was the Anglican Bishop of Okigwe South in Province Two of the Church of Nigeria in 2000.
45. Emmanuel Kana Mani was the Anglican Bishop of Maiduguri in Province Three of the Church of Nigeria in 2000.
46. Miller Maza was the Anglican Bishop of Lafia in Province Three of the Church of Nigeria in 2000.
47. Vincent Muoghereh was the Anglican Bishop of Ughelli in Province One of the Church of Nigeria in 2000.
48. Simon Peters Mutum was the Anglican Bishop of Jalingo in Province Three of the Church of Nigeria in 2000.
49. Henry Ndukuba was the Anglican Bishop of Gombe in Province Three of the Church of Nigeria in 2000.
50. Emmanuel E Nglass was the Anglican Bishop of Uyo in Province Two of the Church of Nigeria in 2000. He was born in 1947. He was Archdeacon of Uyo from 1984 until 1990 when he became Bishop of Uyo. He became Archbishop of Niger Delta Province. He died in 2016.
51. Alfred Iheanyichukwu Sunday Nwaizuzu was the Anglican Bishop of Okigwe North in Province Two of the Church of Nigeria in 2000.
52. Rowland Nwafo Chukwunweike Nwosu was the Anglican Bishop of Asaba in Province Two of the Church of Nigeria in 2000. He was appointed Bishop of Asaba in 1977.
53. Zakka Nyam was the Anglican Bishop of Kano in Province Three of the Church of Nigeria in 2000.
54. Olubayo O. Obijole was the Anglican Bishop of Akoko in Province One of the Church of Nigeria in 2000. Obijole was enthroned at the Cathedral of St. Stephen, Ikare Akoko on 27 November 1999 as the third Bishop of Akoko. He left in 2010 and resumed his position as lecturer at the University of Ibadan. He was succeeded by James Oladunjoye, who held the post for two years.
55. Uju Obinya was the Anglican Bishop of Ukwa in Province Two of the Church of Nigeria in 2000.
56. Bright Joseph Egemasi Ogu was the Anglican Bishop of Mbaise in Province Two of the Church of Nigeria in 2000.
57. Elijah Oluremi Ige Ogundana was the Anglican Bishop of Remo in Province One of the Church of Nigeria in 2000. He died in 2017. He was the first Bishop of Remo Diocese, created on 5 March 1984. He retired in July 2003, and was succeeded by Michael Fape, who was enthroned on 20 November 2003.
58. Samuel Oke was the Anglican Bishop of Ekiti West in Province One of the Church of Nigeria in 2000.
59. Bennett Okoro was the Anglican Bishop of Orlu in Province Two of the Church of Nigeria in 2000.
60. Cyril Okorocha was the Anglican Bishop of Owerri in Province Two of the Church of Nigeria in 2000.
61. Godwin Okpala was the Anglican Bishop of Nnewi in Province Two of the Church of Nigeria in 2000.
62. Segun Okubadejo was the Anglican Bishop of Ibadan North in Province One of the Church of Nigeria in 2000.
63. James Oladunjoye was the Anglican Bishop of Owo in Province One of the Church of Nigeria in 2000.
64. Gideon I O Olajide was the Anglican Bishop of Ibadan in Province One of the Church of Nigeria in 2000. Gideon Isaac Oladipo Olajide; born on 10 March 1930 in Igbemo Ekiti, Ondo State, he was elected Bishop of Ilesa in 1981 and transferred to the Diocese of Ibadan in October 1988. He retired in 2000.
65. Gabriel B Oloniyo was the Anglican Bishop of Ife in Province One of the Church of Nigeria in 2000. He was the first Bishop of Ife; he was enthroned on 4 Nov 1990 and retired in 2007 to be succeeded by Oluranti Odubogun.
66. Joseph Akinyele Omoyajowo was the Anglican Bishop of Ijebu in Province One of the Church of Nigeria in 2000. Born 31 December 1934 in Isarun, Ondo, Omoyajowo was Professor of Religious Studies at Obafemi Awolowo University. He was the pioneer Bishop of Ilaje/Eseodo before being posted to Ijebu.
67. Peter Imhona Onekpe was the Anglican Bishop of Benin in Province One of the Church of Nigeria in 2000.
68. C. B. Onyeibor was the Anglican Bishop of Abakaliki in Province Two of the Church of Nigeria in 2000.
69. Jonathan Onyemelukwe was the Anglican Bishop of On the Niger in Province Two of the Church of Nigeria in 2000.
70. Matthew Oluremi Owadayo was the Anglican Bishop of Egba in Province One of the Church of Nigeria in 2000.
71. Solomon Olaife Oyelade was the Anglican Bishop of Kabba in Province One of the Church of Nigeria in 2000. The diocese of Kabba was created on 12 February 1996, and Oyelade was the first bishop. He had previously been the Provost of Emmanuel Church Cathedral, Ado-Ekiti; he was elected at Sabongidda-Ora on 28 November 1995 for the Diocese of Kabba, consecrated at the Cathedral Church of All Saints, Wuse, Abuja on 11 February 1996, and enthroned on 12 February 1996.
72. Gabriel Herbert Pepple was the Anglican Bishop of Niger Delta in Province Two of the Church of Nigeria in 2000.
73. Olubayu Sowale was the Anglican Bishop of Ilesa in Province One of the Church of Nigeria in 2000.
74. Iyobee Ugede was the Anglican Bishop of Otukpo in Province Three of the Church of Nigeria in 2000. He died of tuberculosis in 2003.
75. Daniel Abubakar Yisa was the Anglican Bishop of Damaturu in Province Three of the Church of Nigeria in 2000.
76. Nathaniel Yisa was the Anglican Bishop of Minna in Province Three of the Church of Nigeria in 2000. He served as the second Bishop of Minna from 1992 until 2005 when he retired.
