= Osun State =

State of Nigeria

Osun Ọ̀ṣun (Yoruba)
- State
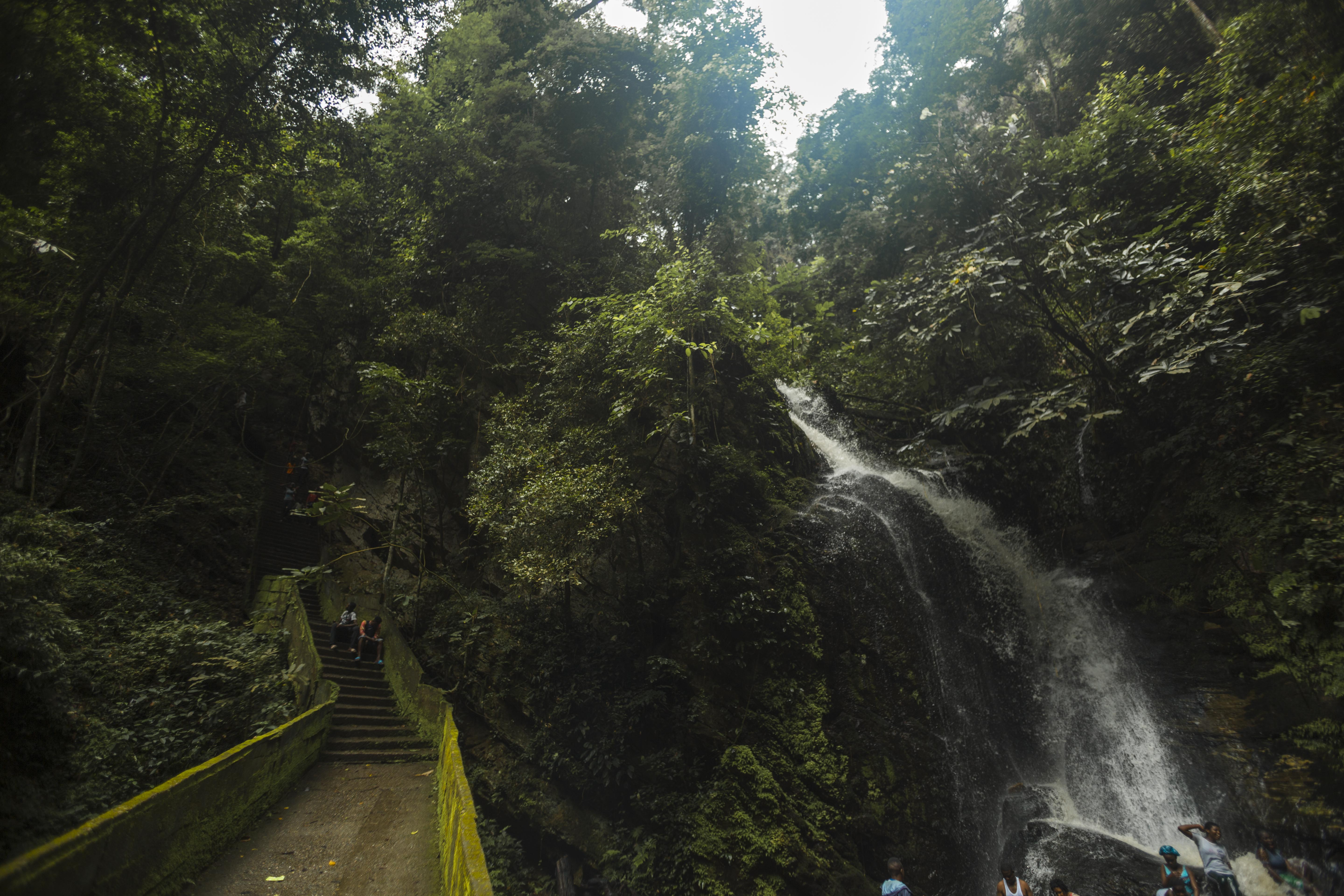
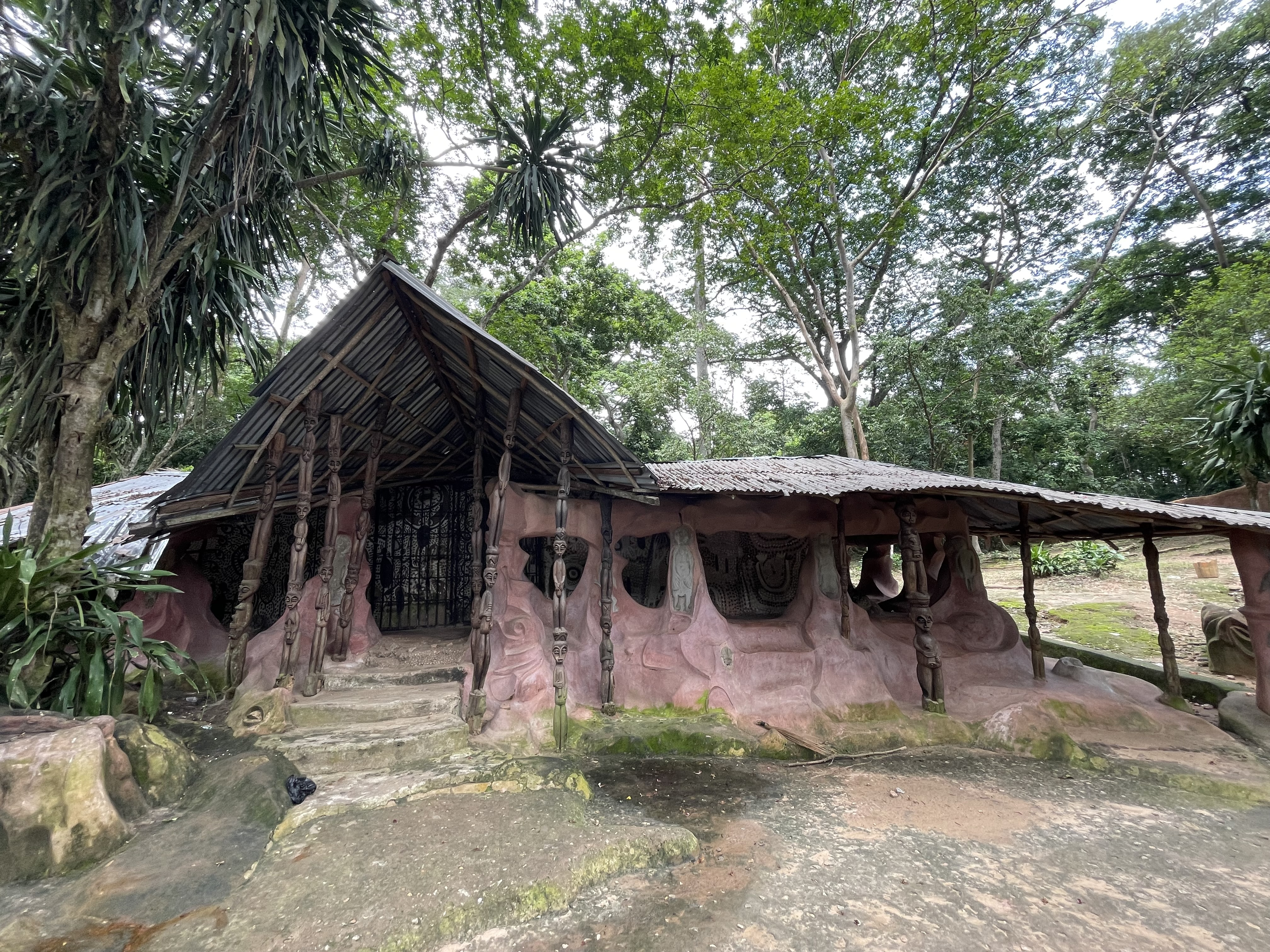
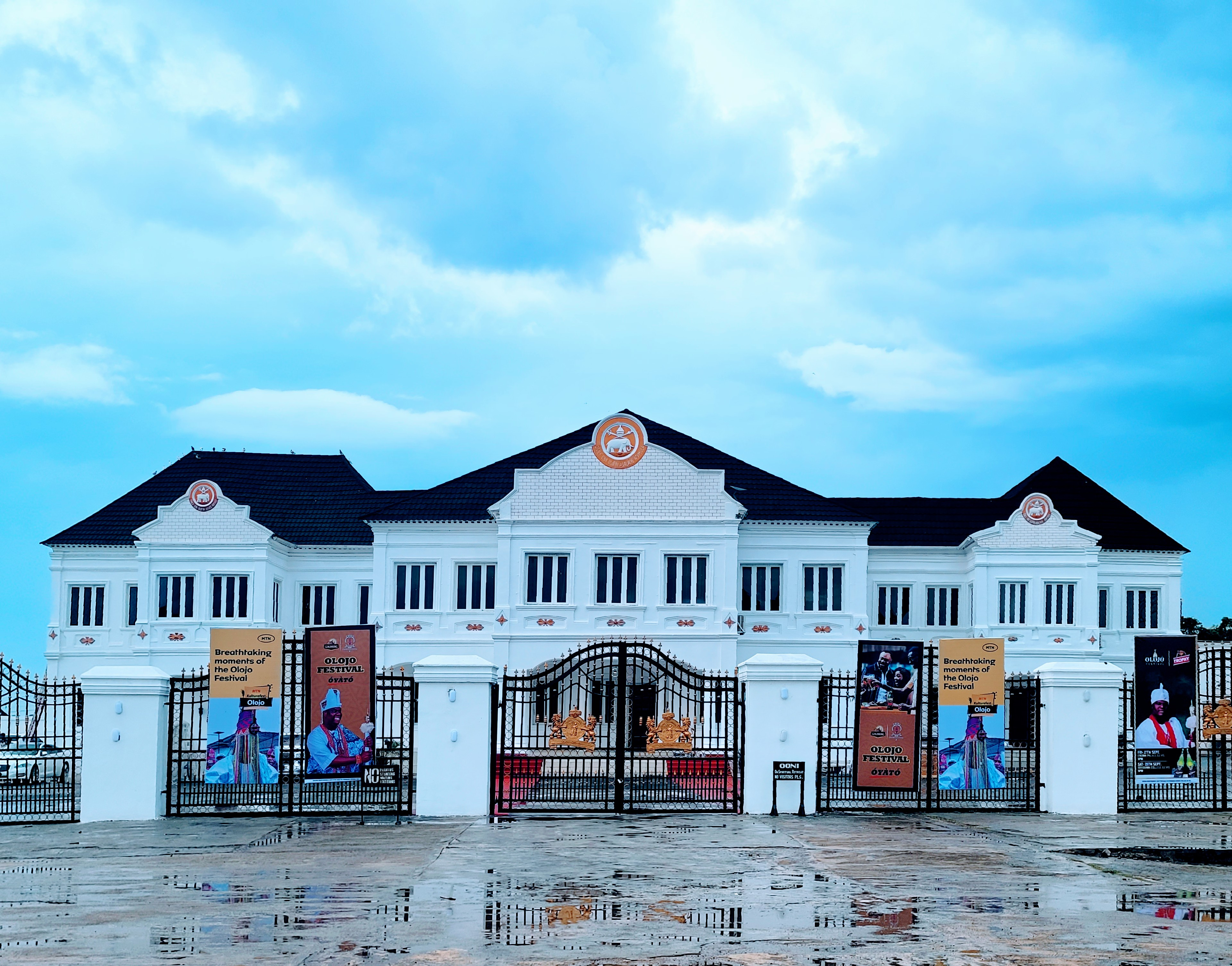
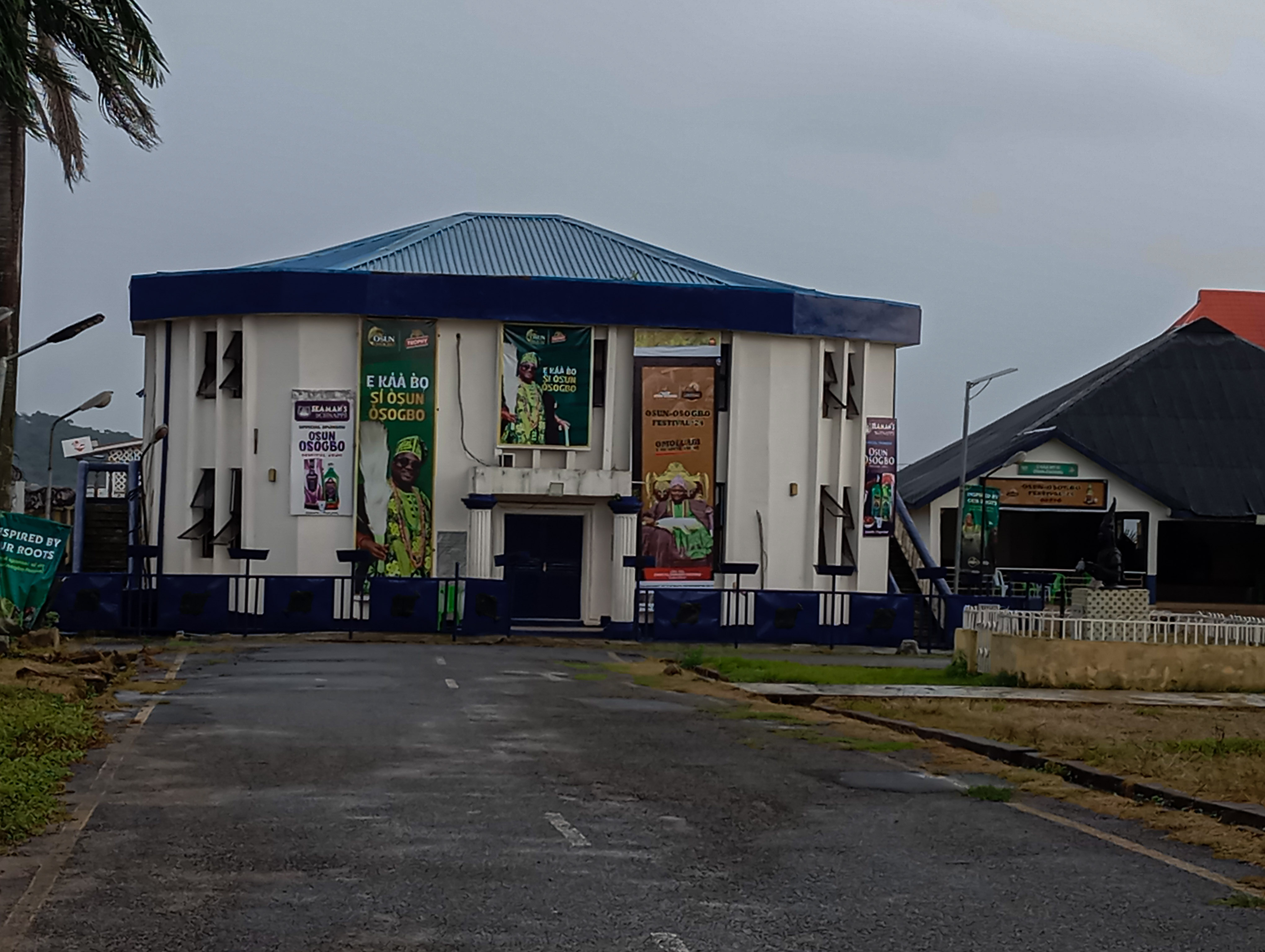
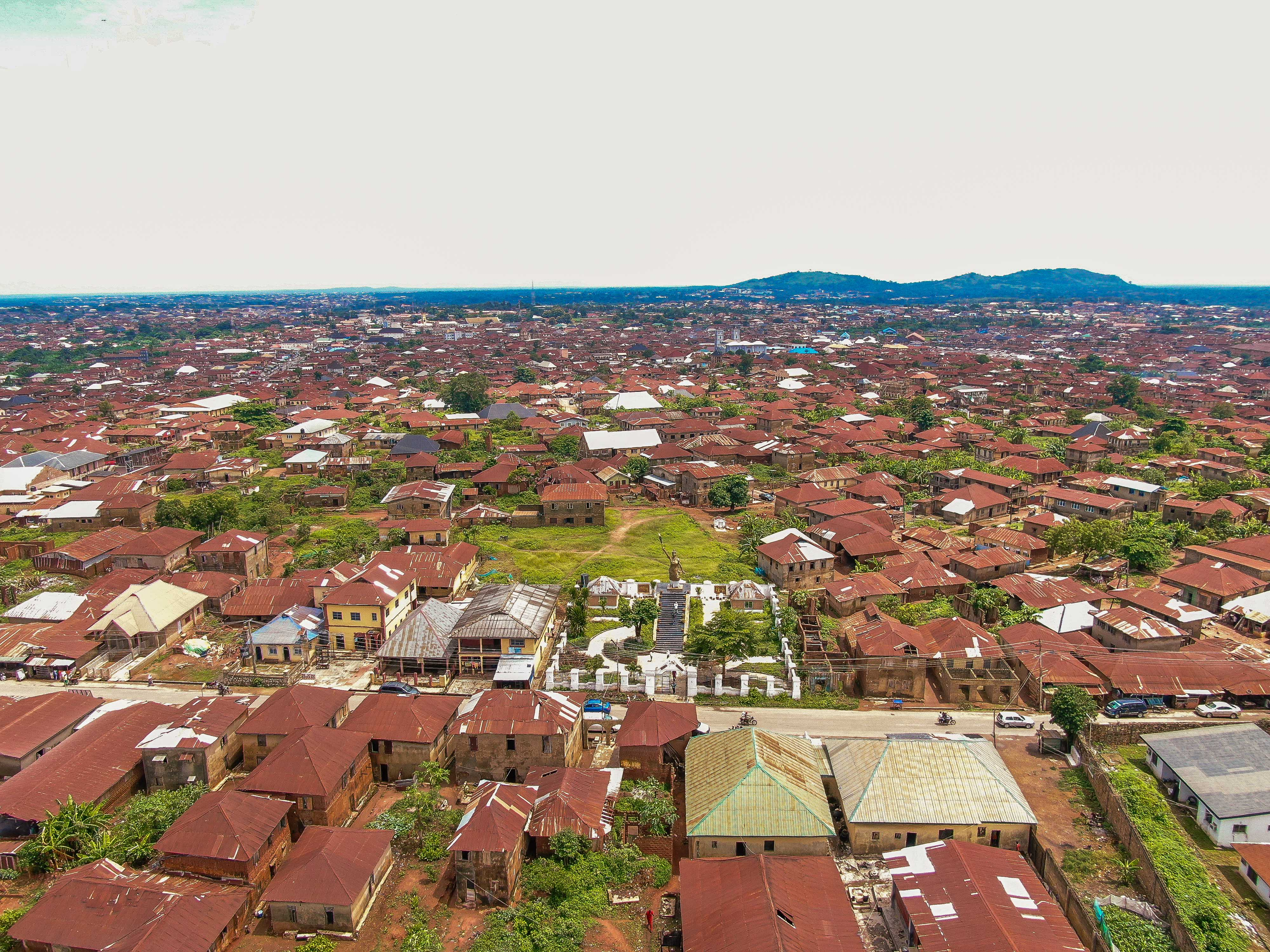
- Erin-Ijesha Waterfalls Osun-Osogbo Ooni's Palace Ataoja's Palace, Osogbo Ifẹ

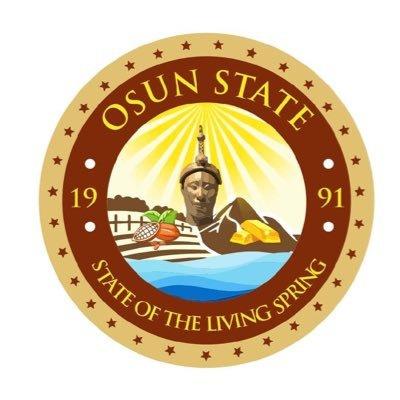
- Flag Seal
- Nicknames: State Of The Living Spring
- Location of Osun State in Nigeria
- Coordinates: 07°30′N 4°30′E
- Country: Nigeria
- Geopolitical Zone: South West
- LGAs: 30
- Date created: 27 August 1991
- Capital: Osogbo

Government
  - Body: Government of Osun State
  - Governor: Ademola Adeleke (PDP)
  - Deputy Governor: Kola Adewusi
  - Legislature: Osun State House of Assembly
  - Senators: C: Olubiyi Fadeyi (PDP); E: Francis Adenigba Fadahunsi (PDP); W: Kamorudeen Olalere Oyewumi (PDP)
  - Representatives: List

Area
  - Total: 9,251 km^{2} (3,572 sq mi)
  - Rank: 28th of 36

Population (2006 census)
  - Total: 3,416,959
  - Estimate (2022): 4435800
  - Rank: 17th of 36
  - Density: 369.4/km^{2} (956.6/sq mi)
- Demonym: Osunian

GDP (PPP)
  - Year: 2021
  - Total: $14.86 billion 24th of 36
  - Per capita: $2,691; 24th of 36
- Time zone: UTC+01 (WAT)
- postal code: 230001
- ISO 3166 code: NG-OS
- HDI (2022): 0.607 medium · 13th of 37
- Website: www.osunstate.gov.ng

Osun (/ˈoʊʃuːn/ OH-shoon; Yoruba: Ìpínlẹ̀ Ọ̀ṣun [ìk͡pĩ́lɛ̀ ɔ̀ʃũ̄]), is a state in southwestern Nigeria; bounded to the east by Ekiti and Ondo states for 84 km (52.20 mi) and 78 km (48.47 mi) respectively, to the north by Kwara State for 73 km (45.36 mi), to the south by Ogun State for 84 km (52.2 mi) and to the west by Oyo State, mostly across the Osun River. Named after the River Osun—a vital river which flows through the state—the state was formed from the southeast of Oyo State on 27 August 1991 and has its capital as the city of Osogbo.

Of the 36 states of Nigeria, Osun is the ninth smallest in area and 25th most populous state with an estimated population of about 4.7 million as of 2016. Geographically, the state is divided between the Nigerian lowland forests in most of the state and the drier Guinean forest–savanna mosaic in the north. The major geographical features are rivers including the state's namesake, the River Osun which bisects the state's interior before forming much of the state's southwestern border with Oyo State and flowing south. Other important rivers are the Erinle and Oba rivers, both Osun tributaries which flow from the north before meeting the Osun along the southwestern border. Among the state's fauna are mona monkey, common kestrel, purple heron, and royal antelope, along with some of Nigeria's last remaining Nigeria-Cameroon chimpanzee and African forest elephant which inhabit the heavily threatened forests along the southern borders with Ondo and Ogun states.

Osun State is primarily inhabited by the Yoruba people, mainly of the Ibolo, Ifẹ, Igbomina, Ijesha, and Oyo subgroups.

In the pre-colonial period, the area that is now Osun State was split up between various Western Yoruba states with some states being town-based as others were part of larger empires like the Oyo Empire. From 1877 to 1893, Western Yoruba states fought the Kiriji War alongside other Eastern Yoruba groups against Eastern Yoruba groups; the war ended in a British-brokered stalemate before the area was colonized and incorporated into the British Southern Nigeria Protectorate which later merged into British Nigeria in 1914. After independence in 1960, the area of now-Osun was a part of the post-independence Western Region until 1967 when the region was split and the area became part of the Western State. In 1976, the Western State was split and the state's west became Oyo State. Fifteen years later, Oyo State's east was broken off to form Osun State.

Economically, Osun State is largely based around agriculture, mainly of cocoa, cassava, millet, cashew, banana, maize, potato and yam crops. Other key industries are services, especially in urban areas, along with artisanal mining and livestock herding. Osun is home to several of Nigeria's most famous landmarks, including the campus of Obafemi Awolowo University, one of Nigeria's pre-eminent institutions of higher learning. The university is located in the ancient town of Ile-Ifẹ, an important early center of political and religious development for Yoruba culture. Other important cities and towns include the ancient kingdom-capitals of Ila Orangun, Iragbiji, Ada, Ikirun, Oke-Ila Orangun, Ipetu-Ijesha, Ijebu-Jesa, Erin Oke, Ipetumodu, Ede, Ilobu,Iwo, Ejigbo, Ibokun, Ode-Omu, Otan Ayegbaju, Ifetedo, Esa-Oke, Ilesa, Okuku, Otan-Ile and Igbajo. Osun State is additionally noted for having the second highest literacy rate in the country.

== History ==
The modern State of Osun was created on 27 August 1991 from part of the old Oyo State. The state's name is derived from the River Osun, the venerated natural spring that is the manifestation of the Yoruba goddess of the same name.

The former Governor Olagunsoye Oyinlola launched and laid the foundation for the groundbreaking of Osun State University with six campuses (Osogbo, Okuku, Ikire, Ejigbo, Ifetedo, and Ipetu-Ijesha) strategically located across the state. Important cultural events in the state include the Ori Oke and Egungun festival (masquerade festival) in Iragbiji, Olojo in Ife, Iwude Ijesha in Ilesha, Agbeleku Festival in Erin Oke, and the Osun Osogbo festival.

== Culture ==
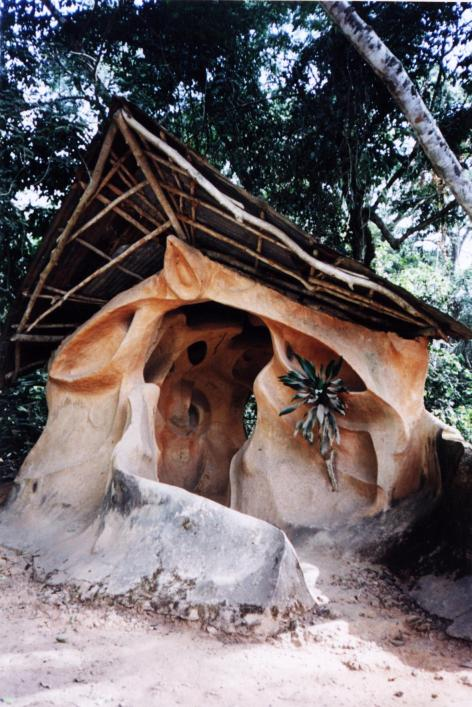
Osun temple

Every year, adherents and non-adherents of Osun, one of the Orisa (the traditional deities of the Yoruba people), travel from all over the world to attend the annual Osun-Osogbo festival in August. Visitors include nationals of Brazil, Cuba, Trinidad, Grenada, and other nations in the Americas with a significant Yoruba cultural heritage. Annual traditional festivities and invocations of the Osun goddess are held along the banks of the river bearing her name into which – according to Yoruba Oratory traditions – she transformed.

Ọsun-Ọsogbo Grove, the shrine of the annual rites of the deity and an important artistic center, was declared a World Heritage Site in 2005.

The former semi-official flag and seal of the state, adopted in 2012, depicted the Ori Olokun. However, the flag and seal were officially relinquished in 2023 by act of the Osun State House of Assembly following a 21 January 2017 ruling by the Osun State High Court that the legislation adopting it had been unconstitutional.

== Demographics ==
The major sub-ethnic groups in Ọsun State are Ife, Ijesha, Oyo, Ibolo and Igbomina of the Yoruba people, although there are also people from other parts of Nigeria. Yoruba and English are the official languages. People of Osun State practice Christianity, Islam and the traditional faith.

== Climate ==
Located at an elevation of 266.33 metres (873.8 ft) above sea level, Osun has a Tropical wet and dry or savanna climate (Classification: Aw). The city's yearly temperature is 28.35 °C (83.03 °F) and it is -1.11% lower than Nigeria's averages. Osun typically receives about 127.75 millimetres (5.03 inches) of precipitation and has 237.62 rainy days (65.1% of the time) annually. It is located at 4.5199593 longitude and 7.5628964 latitude.

== Tourism ==
The State of Osun is home to a lot of tourist attractions based on its rich history and the cultural base of the Yoruba.

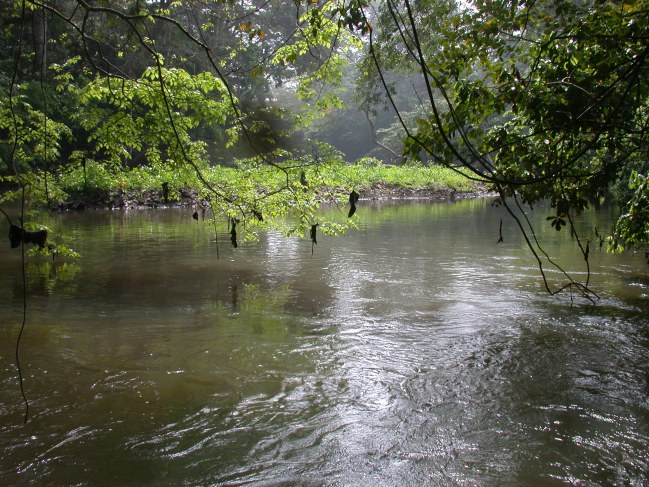
Osun River in Osun state, Nigeria

This place is considered as an heritage site. It is located along the Osun river and it is home to the goddess of fertility, Ọṣun.

Erin-Ijesha Waterfalls is located in Erin-Ijesha. It is a tourist attraction located in Oriade local. The fall features seven floors.

== Mineral Resources in Osun State ==
The following are the mineral resources in Osun State

- Gold
- Granite
- Columbite
- Talc
- Tantalite
- Tourmaline

== Christians and Muslims in Osun ==
Osun State has a large population of both Muslims and Christians. Among the famous religious leaders from Osun State is the London-based Muslim cleric Sheikh Dr. Abu-Abdullah Adelabu, who hails from the state's capital city, Osogbo and Pastor (Dr.) Johnson Ade Odewale of Christ Apostolic Church, from Odeomu but based in Boston, USA. The popular Pastor E.A. Adeboye hails from Ifewara in Osun state. Also Pastor W. F. Kumuyi among others. The Osun State government claims to offer services to both Muslims and Christians in the state, especially through Pilgrims Welfare Boards.

The major traditional rulers in Osun State acclaim either the Faith of Islam or Christianity. While, for instance, Ooni of Ife Oba Adeyeye Enitan Ogunwusi (Ojaja II) and Owa Obokun Adimula of Ijesaland Oba Clement Adesuyi Haastrup Ajimoko II), Oba Samuel Oyebode Oluronke II (Olokuku of Okuku), and Oba Sunday Olatokun (Olotan of Otan Ile) ascribe to Christianity, Orangun of (Ile) Ila-Orangun Oba Wahab Kayode Adedeji Oyedotun (Arutu-Oluokun Bibiire I), Ataoja of Osogbo Oba Jimoh Olaonipekun Oyetunji (Larooye II), Timi of Ede Oba Munirudeen Adesola Lawal (Laminisa I), Aragbiji of iragbiji (Oba Abdulrasheed Ayotunde Olabomi), Owa of Otan Ayegbaju Oba Lukman Ojo Fadipe (Olatanka III), and Oluwo of Iwo Oba Abdul Rasheed Adewale Akanbi (Ilufemiloye Telu I) practice Islam. The dominant religions in Osun State are Islam and Christianity although a certain amount of traditional religion is still practiced.

2.2% Catholic in the Diocese of Osogbo (1995) with 74,440 followers in 56 parishes under Bishop John Akinkunmi Oyejola (2016), a suffragan of the Archdiocese of Ibadan.

The Anglican Province of Ibadan within the Church of Nigeria includes the Dioceses of Oke-Osun (1993) led by Bishop Oluwagbemiro Fabuluje (2021), Osun (1987) led by Bishop Foluso Olugbenga Babatunji (2019), Osun North led by Bishop Abiodun Olaoye, Osun North East (2009) led by Bishop Ebenezer Akorede Okuyelu (2019), Ife led by Bishop Olubunmi Akinlade, Ife East (2008) led by Bishop Oluseyi Oyelade (2010), Ijesa North East (2009) led by Bishop Joseph Olusola (2009), Ijesha North Missionary Diocese led by Bishop Isaac Oluyamo (2015), Ilesa led by Bishop Samuel Olubayu Sowale (2000), and Ilesa South West led by Bishop Samuel Egbebunmi (2009).

== Education ==
Tertiary institutions in Osun state include:

- Adeleke University, Ede
- Bowen University Iwo
- Fountain University Osogbo
- Federal College of Education Iwo
- Federal Polytechnic, Ede
- Ikirun College of Health Technology
- Joseph Ayo Babalola University, Ipo Arakeji and Ikeji Arakeji
- National Open University of Nigeria Iwo, Osogbo and Otan Ayegbaju Study centre
- Obafemi Awolowo University, Ile-Ife
- Osun State College of Health Technology, Ilesa
- Osun State College of Technology, Esa-Oke
- Osun State Polytechnic, Iree
- Osun State University
- Westland University Iwo

== Economy ==
The state is one of the richer and more developed ones in Nigeria and has a low incidence of extreme poverty (around 4% of the population against a national average of 31%) according to World Bank data from 2018.

== Transportation ==
Federal Highway:

- A122 east from Oyo State at Erinmi via Ife to Ondo State at Igbara Oke.

Other major roads include:

- the Iwo-Osogbo Rd east from Iwo for 46 km,
- Ajasse Ipo-Osogbo Rd northeast from Osogbo via Ikirun to Kwara State at Ila-Odo,
- the Ikirun-Ila Orangun Rd northeast from Ikirun to Ila Orangun,
- the Ora Rd east from Ila Orangun to Kwara State near Ila,
- the Ikokum-Ijero Ekiti Rd southeast from Igbajo to Igbeja in Ekiti State,
- northeast from A122 at Iwaraja via Erimo to Ekiti State as Erimo-Effon Alaiye Rd,
- Ipetu-Ondo Rd south from A122 at Ikeji Oke to Ondo State near Onipou,
- Ondo-Ife Rd southeast from Ife to Ondo State at Okeigo,
- Fatimo Rd southeast from A122 at Apomu as the Mokore-Allabameta-Omisere Rd to Ondo State at Omisore,
- Ibadan-Iwo Rd southwest from Iwo to Oyo State at Alagbon Village,
- the Ojongbodu-Awe-Alabo-Iwo Rd northwest from Iwo at Kiyeseni to A1 in Oyo,
- Ede-Ejigbo Rd northwest from the Iwo-Osogbo Rd at Ede to Oyo State at Afaro,
- Oke Elerin Rd west from Ikirun by ferry to Oyo State at Ilie.
- Ilobu-oko-Ogbomosho linking Oyo to Osun

During Governor Aregbesola’s term 2010-18 his administration completed 368 km of state roads and built five bridges where none existed before, and 216 km of local council roads.

Railways:

Osogbo is on the 1067 mm Cape Gauge the Western Line north from Lagos to Kano.

== Local Government Areas ==
Osun State is divided into three federal senatorial districts, each of which is composed of two administrative zones. The state consists of thirty Local Government Areas and Area offices, the primary (third-tier) unit of government in Nigeria.

Osun State's 30 Local Government Area headquarters:

LGA	Headquarters
Aiyedaade	Gbongan
Aiyedire	Ile Ogbo
Atakunmosa East	Iperindo
Atakunmosa West	Osu
Boluwaduro	Otan Ayegbaju
Boripe	Iragbiji
Ede North	Oja Timi
Ede South	Ede
Egbedore	Awo
Ejigbo	Ejigbo
Ife Central	Ile-Ife
Ife East	Oke-Ogbo
Ife North	Ipetumodu
Ife South	Ifetedo
Ifedayo	Oke-Ila Orangun
Ifelodun	Ikirun
Ila	Ila Orangun
Ilesa East	Ilesa
Ilesa West	Ereja Square
Irepodun	Ilobu
Irewole	Ikire
Isokan	Apomu
Iwo	Iwo
Obokun	Ibokun
Odo Otin	Okuku
Ola Oluwa	Bode Osi
Olorunda	Igbonna, Osogbo
Oriade	Ijebu-Jesa
Orolu	Ifon Osun
Osogbo	Osogbo

List of current Local Government Area Chairmen.

== Notable people ==
- Enoch Adeboye – General Overseer, Redeemed Christian Church of God
- Gbenga Adeboye – musician, comedian and radio presenter
- Toyin Adegbola – actress
- Chief Dr. Oyin Adejobi – former actor, dramatist and popular poet
- Sheikh Abu-Abdullah Adelabu – scholar and cleric.
- Sen. Ademola Adeleke - Governor of Osun State
- Isiaka Adeleke – politician and former Governor
- Israel Adesanya - former kickboxer and boxer, mixed martial artist.
- Toyin Ajao – interdisciplinary scholar, feminist activist and holistic wellbeing practitioner
- Chief Adebisi Akande- former Governor of Osun State
- Charles Akindiji Akinola – Chief of staff to the governor of Osun
- General Ipoola Alani Akinrinade (RTD) - former Chief of Army Staff and the First Chief of Defence Staff in Nigeria.
- Akinloye Akinyemi – former Nigerian major
- Bolaji Amusan - Nigerian ICT entrepreneur
- Olusola Amusan – entrepreneur, speaker
- Ogbeni Rauf Aregbesola – former State Governor
- Lanre Buraimoh - artist
- Davido – musician
- Patricia Etteh, Nigerian politician and first female Speaker of the Nigerian House of Representatives
- Daddy Freeze- radio presenter
- Bola Ige SAN-(1930–2001) politician and lawyer
- William Kumuyi – General Overseer, Deeper Life Christian Church
- Duro Ladipo – actor and dramatist
- Abideen Olasupo - Nigerian businessman
- Gabriel Oladele Olutola - President of the Apostolic church of Nigeria and LAWNA Territorial Chairman.
- Isaac Olayiwola - (Popularly known as Layi Wasabi) Nigerian Comedian
- Iyiola Omisore – politician and engineer
- David Oyedepo - Preacher and Founder of Winners Chapel International Church
- Hameed Adekunle Makama Oyelude - Tegbosun III popularly known as Olowu of Kuta
- Gboyega Oyetola - Former Governor of Osun State
- Prince Olagunsoye Oyinlola – former Governor of Osun State and former Military Governor of Lagos State
- Oba William Adetona Ayeni- Orangun of Ila Orangun
- Chief Kola Balogun - First Minister of Information and National Orientation

== Politics ==
The state government is led by a democratically elected governor who works closely with members of the state's house of assembly. The capital city of the state is Osogbo.

== Electoral System ==
The electoral system of each state is selected using a modified two-round system. To be elected in the first round, a candidate must receive the plurality of the vote and over 25% of the vote in at least two -third of the State local government Areas. If no candidate passes threshold, a second round will be held between the top candidate and the next candidate to have received a plurality of votes in the highest number of local government Areas.

== See also ==
- List of governors of Osun State
- Osun Health Insurance Scheme (O'HIS)
