= Anglican Province of Ibadan =

Anglican province in Nigeria

The Ibadan Province is an ecclesiastical province of the Church of Nigeria. It was created when the division into ecclesiastical provinces was adopted in 2002, and it comprises 19 dioceses, 117 archdeaconries and 623 parishes.

It comprised the following 19 dioceses in 2008:

- Ajayi Crowther (11 March 2007; bishop: Olugbenga Olukemi Oduntan)
- Ekiti Kwara (26 May 2008; bishop: Andrew Ajayi)
- Ibadan (founded 25 January 1952, from the Diocese of Lagos; bishop: Joseph Akinfenwa)
- Ibadan North (14 December 1998; bishop: Segun Okubadejo)
- Ibadan South (13 July 1999; bishop: Jacob Ajetunmobi)
- Ife (4 November 1990; bishop: Olubunmi Akinlade)
- Ife East (28 May 2008; bishop: Rufus Okeremi)
- Igbomina (14 July 1999; bishop: Michael Akinyemi)
- Ilesa (2 November 1974; bishop: Samuel Sowole)
- Jebba (25 May 2008; bishop: Oluwaseun Adeyinka Aderogba)
- Kwara (1 November 1974; bishop: Olusegun Adeyemi)
- New Bussa (9 March 2007; bishop:Israel Amoo)
- Offa (14 July 1999; bishop: Akintunde Popoola)
- Ogbomoso (18 March 2005; bishop: Matthew Osunade)
- Oke-Ogun (11 March 2007; bishop: Solomon Amusan)
- Oke-Osun (25 January 1993; bishop: Oluwagbemiro Fabuluje)
- Omu-Aran (10 March 2007; bishop: Philip Adeyemo)
- Osun (3 August 1987; bishop: James Afolabi Popoola)
- Oyo (19 November 2003; bishop: Jacob Ola Fasipe)

The Diocese of Oyo South was created out of the Oyo Diocese in 2025

== Dioceses in 2025 ==
After the creation of the province of Kwara, the list of Dioceses and Bishops in the province of Ibadan in 2025 was:

Anglican Province of Ibadan; Archbishop: Williams Oluwarotimi Aladekugbe

1. Ajayi Crowther Diocese; Bishop: Collins Olufemi Babalola
2. Ibadan Diocese; Bishop: Joseph Akinfenwa
3. Ibadan North Diocese; Bishop: Williams Oluwarotimi Aladekugbe
4. Ibadan South Diocese; Bishop: Akintunde Popoola
5. Ife Diocese; Bishop: Olubunmi Akinlade
6. Ife East Diocese; Bishop: Oluseyi Oyelade
7. Ijesa North East Diocese; Bishop: Joseph Olusola
8. Ijesha North Missionary Diocese; Bishop: Isaac Oluyamo
9. Ilesa Diocese; Bishop: Dapo Asaju
10. Ilesa South West Diocese; Bishop: Adebola Ojofeitimi
11. Ogbomoso Diocese; Bishop: Titus Babatunde Olayinka
12. Oke-Ogun Diocese; Bishop: Andrew Adebiyi
13. Oke-Osun Diocese; Bishop: Oluwagbemiro Fabuluje
14. Osun Diocese; Bishop: Foluso Olugbenga Babatunji
15. Osun North Diocese; Bishop: Samuel Ifeyemi
16. Osun North East Diocese; Bishop: Samuel Osungbeju
17. Oyo Diocese; Bishop: Kemi Oduntan
18. Oyo South Diocese; Bishop: Ebenezer Familoni

== Archbishops of the Province ==
- ?–2013: Joseph Akinfenwa, Bishop of Ibadan (re-elected 2007)
- 2013–present: Segun Okubadejo, Bishop of Ibadan North
