= Peter Awelewa Adebiyi =

Anglican bishop in Nigeria (1943–2022)

Peter Awelewa Adebiyi (27 April 1943 – 10 February 2022) was a Nigerian Anglican bishop. He served as the Bishop of Lagos West in Lagos Province of the Church of Nigeria.

== Biography ==
Adebiyi was born at Osi-Ekiti, Nigeria, on 27 April 1943, where he went to school until 1960. He graduated from the Emmanuel College of Theology, Ibadan, in 1970, and obtained B.A. (1975), M.A. (1981) and PhD (1987) from the University of Ife, Osun State.

He was a lecturer at Lagos State University, Ojo, Lagos between 1987 and 1990.

Adebiyi became Archdeacon in 1990, and was consecrated Bishop of Owo on 26 May 1993, before being translated to Bishop of Lagos West on 20 November 1999. He retired in 2013 having reached 70, and was succeeded by James Odedeji.

He was appointed Bishop of Lagos West in 1999 having been Bishop of Owo from 1993 to 1999.

Adebiyi died on 10 February 2022, at the age of 78.

== Works ==
His published works include:

- The Ministry of Women in Ekitiland.
- History of Christianity in Ekitiland (1893-1973).
- The Planting of Christianity in Ekitiland: The Role of the Ex-Slaves.

He wrote two books with fellow bishop Akin Omoyajowo: (i) 150 years of Christianity in Nigeria and (ii) The Church Fathers.
