= Solomon Olusola Akanbi =

Anglican bishop in Nigeria

Solomon Olusola Akanbi is an Anglican bishop in Nigeria. He has been Bishop of the Offa diocese since 2018. The mandate is one of the eight within the Anglican province of kwara, itself is one of the fourteenth provinces within the church of Nigeria. The last Bishop was Akintunde popoola and the present is Solomon Olusola Akanbi.
