= Diocese of Jalingo =

Diocese of Jalingo may refer to:

- Anglican Diocese of Jalingo
- Roman Catholic Diocese of Jalingo
