= Yesufu =

Surname common in Nigeria

- Gender: Female
- Language: Hausa

Origin
- Origin: Nigeria
- Region of origin: Northern region

Yesufu is a Hausa surname common in Nigeria.

== Notable individuals with the name ==
- Aisha Yesufu (born 1973), Nigerian activist
- Yesufu Lumu, Anglican bishop in Nigeria
- T. M. Yesufu, Nigerian academic
