= Ogundana =

Ogundana is a Nigerian surname. Notable people with the surname include:

- Elijah Ogundana (died 2017), a bishop in the Church of Nigeria
- Funmilola Ogundana (1980–2013), Nigerian sprinter who specialized in the 100 metres
- Shola Ogundana (born 2005), Nigerian professional footballer
