= Titus Babatunde Olayinka =

Anglican bishop in Nigeria

Titus Babatunde Olayinka is the Anglican Bishop of Ogbomoso in Ibadan Province of the Church of Nigeria.

He was elected Bishop of Ogbomoso in 2015 on the retirement of Matthew Osunade.
