= Precious Nwala =

Anglican bishop in Nigeria

Okechukwu Precious Nwala is the Anglican Bishop of Etche in Nigeria: Etche being one of nine dioceses in the Anglican Province of the Niger Delta, itself one of 14 within the Church of Nigeria.
