= Marcus Dogo =

Anglican bishop in Nigeria

Marcus Madugu Dogo is an Anglican bishop in Nigeria: formerly an Archdeacon, since 2011 he has been the Bishop of Kafanchan, one of seventeen dioceses within the Anglican Province of Abuja, itself one of 14 provinces within the Church of Nigeria.
