= Funkuro Godrules Amgbare =

Anglican bishop of Nigeria

Funkuro Godrules Amgbare is an Anglican bishop in Nigeria: he is the current Bishop of Northern Izon one of nine in the Anglican Province of the Niger Delta, itself one of 14 within the Church of Nigeria.

He was elected Bishop in 2018.
