= Samuel Egbebunmi =

Anglican bishop in Nigeria

Olubayo Sowale is an Anglican bishop in Nigeria: he is the current Bishop of Ilesa South West.

He was consecrated on 12 January 2009 in Ughelli, Delta State.
