= Foluso Taiwo =

Anglican bishop in Nigeria (died 2020)

Foluso Taiwo was an Anglican bishop in Nigeria: he was Bishop of Oke-Osun until his death in November 2020.
