= Clement Ekpeye =

Anglican bishop in Nigeria

The Rt. Revd Clement Nathan Ekpeye (DSSRS, JP, AP) Pioneer Bishop is an Anglican bishop in Nigeria: he is the current Bishop of Ahoada one of nine in the Anglican Province of the Niger Delta, itself one of 14 within the Church of Nigeria.

The Rt. Revd. Clement Nathan Ekpeye was consecrated Bishop of the newly created Anglican Diocese of Ahoada on 25 July 2004 at the Cathedral Church of the Advent, Abuja.

In 1952,a new diocese was carved out of the Niger Delta Protectorate and named Niger Delta Diocese and Ahoada and its surroundings became part of this Diocese. Ahoada had a full parish church under the new Diocese, it became a district and later and Archdeaconry made up of Ekepye, Egene, Abua, Ogba, Egbema, Ndoni, Ahoada is now a Diocese on its own, hence it is now addressed as the Diocese of Ahoada from July 2004 with Saint Paul's Church as a Cathedral.
