= Williams Oluwarotimi Aladekugbe =

Anglican bishop in Nigeria

Williams Oluwarotimi Aladekugbe is an Anglican bishop in Nigeria: he is the current Bishop of Oyo.

Aladekugbe was the Dean of Ezekiel College of Theology Ujoelen Ekpoma, Edo state before his election to succeed Jacob Ola Fasipe as Bishop of Oyo at the 11th General Synod of the Church of Nigeria, held at the Cathedral Church of the Good Shepherd, Enugu, in September 2014.

== Notes ==
]
