= Joseph Akinfenwa =

Anglican bishop in Nigeria

Joseph Olatunji Akinfenwa (born 24 May 1956) is an Anglican bishop in Nigeria: he is Bishop of Ibadan, one of nineteen in the Anglican Province of Ibadan, itself one of 14 within the Church of Nigeria.

Akinfenwa was born in Zaria on 24 May 1956. He is a graduate of Ahmadu Bello University, holds a Diploma in Theology from St Francis Assisi Theological College, Wusasa, Zaria and has Masters' and PhD degrees from the University of Ilorin.

He was ordained in 1986 at St Michael's Cathedral, Kaduna, of which he became Archdeacon in 1994. On 6 January 1998, he was consecrated Bishop of Sokoto before being translated to Bishop of Ibadan in April 2000.

Akinfenwa became the first Archbishop of Ibadan in January 2003, a post he held for two terms, until 2013.
