= Abraham Akinlalu =

Anglican bishop of Nigeria

Abraham Akinlalu is a former Anglican bishop in Nigeria. He is Bishop Emeritus of the Anglican Diocese of Oke-Osun; he retired in 2019.

He was elected as Bishop of Oke-Osun in 2010 on the retirement of Bishop Fasogbon.
