= Stephen Oni =

Anglican bishop in Nigeria

Stephen Adeniran Oni is an Anglican bishop in Nigeria: he has been Bishop of Ondo since 2018.

Oni was educated at the University of Ibadan and ordained in 1999. He has a Special Life Membership Award from the Bible Society Of Nigeria
