= George Latunji Lasebikan =

Anglican bishop of Nigeria

George Latunji Lasebikan (born August 1948) was the Anglican Bishop of Ondo in 2007, in Ondo Province of the Church of Nigeria.

Lasebikan was born in August 1948 in Ibadan to the family of Rev. Gabriel Ladokun and Mrs Grace Jokotade Lasebikan. Lasebikan hails from the Mele compound of Kudeti, Ibadan, a historically significant site known for being home to the first church and school in Ibadan. His ancestors, including High Chief Mele, were among the first Christian converts in Ibadan in the 1800s, and their family played a crucial role in the spread of Christianity in the region.

He attended Ibadan Grammar School and Loyola College, Ibadan. He spent twelve years at the University of Ibadan, gaining Diploma, B.A. and M.A. in Religious Studies, M.Ed. in Guidance and Counselling and Ph.D. in Religious Studies specializing in the Old Testament. He also attended Lincoln Theological College from 1989 to 1990.

He is the first son and second child of his parents. Amongst his siblings are Chief (Mrs) Omotunde Lawson, the Koseleri of Oke-Ona Egba land, and Professor Victor Lasebikan, a renowned professor of psychiatry and addiction medicine.

He became Deacon in 1984, Canon in April 1992 and Archdeacon in 1995; he left his post of Senior Lecturer at the University of Ibadan to become the sixth Bishop of Ondo in 1998.

He was elected Archbishop of Ondo Province in 2012 and he served 2 terms (the second beginning in 2016) as Archbishop of Ondo Province and also served as Dean of the Church of Nigeria, before retiring in 2018.

Following years of service in the Anglican Church, Lasebikan was appointed a professor of Old Testament Studies.
