= Cornelius Adagbada =

Anglican bishop in Nigeria

Cornelius Adagbada is an Anglican bishop in Nigeria: a former archdeacon, he has been Bishop of Oke-Ogun since 2018.
