= Matthew Osunade =

Anglican bishop in Nigeria

Matthew Osunade was an Anglican bishop in Nigeria: he was the Bishop of Ogbomoso until his retirement in 2014.

He was consecrated as the pioneer Bishop of Ogbomoso on 13 March 2005, having previously been at The Cathedral of St James Ibadan. He retired in 2014, and was succeeded as Bishop of Ogbomoso by Titus Babatunde Olayinka.

== Notes ==
[
