= Dapo Folorunsho Asaju =

Nigerian academic and Anglican bishop (born 1961)

Dapo Folorusho
- Born: Dapo; 16 November 1961 (age 64); Iyara Ijumo, Kogi State, Nigeria
- Education: University of Ilorin
- Occupations: Academic, bishop

Dapo Folorunsho Asaju (born 16 November 1961) is an academician and also the Bishop Theologian of the Anglican Church of Nigeria and the former vice chancellor of Ajayi Crowther University (October 1, 2015-30 September 2020). Dapo was appointed by the Governing council of Ajayi Crowther University.

== Early life and education ==
Asaju hails from Iyara Ijumu, in Kogi state, Nigeria. He started his primary education at St. Andrew's primary school, Kabba, where he later proceeded to Holy Trinity at Lokoja. He later concluded his studies at Oke-suna B Primary School, Oja-Oba, Ilorin. He attended Abdul Azeez Memorial College, Okene, for his secondary education. He is an alumnus of the University of Ilorin, where he obtained his Bachelor of Arts degree in 1983; Master of Arts in Christian Studies in 1985 and his Ph.D. in Christian Studies in 2003, from the same university. He delivered the university's first Alumni Lecture in 1985. He also got Masters in Mission from Birmingham Christian College, Selly Oak, Birmingham, UK, in 2003.

== Career ==
Asaju began his career as a graduate assistant (1983–1984) at University of Ilorin and Assistant Lecturer in Lagos State University (1984–1988). He became a Lecturer II in 1988, Lecturer I (1990), Senior lecturer (1992), all in Lagos State University. He worked in University of Ilorin as a sabbatical Senior lecturer (1995), Associate Professor (2000) and rose to the post of a Professor of Christian Studies in 2004. He delivered his Inaugural lecture in 2005, titled ‘ Re-enthroning Theology as Queen of Sciences: Theological and Missiological Challenges of African Biblical Hermeneutics’. He was Visiting Professor and William Paton Fellow at the Department of Theology, Birmingham University, UK where he later served as External Examiner to three PhD theses. He was acting Dean, Faculty of Arts Lagos State University., 2005–2007; Acting Deputy Vice Chancellor (Academic) Lagos State University; Member Governing Council, Lagos State University (2006–2008), member, Advisory Council to Government of Lagos State, Visiting Associate Professor Bayreuth University, Germany. He was one time chairman, |Academic Staff Union, Lagos State University, 1988–1993.

== Membership of academic bodies ==
Asaju is a member of the Constitution Drafting Committee for inauguration of Lagos West Diocese and Theological Resource Grading for GAFCON Church of Nigeria.

== Affiliations ==
Professor Asaju, is a member of several and academic societies, including Constitution Drafting Committee for the inauguration of Lagos West Diocese, member Theological resource Grading for GAFCON Church of Nigeria; British Society of New Testament Studies, Nigeria Association for Christian Studies, Nigeria association for bible studies, Academic staff union of Universities among others.

== Personal life ==
Asaju was Vicar of Church of Epiphany, Iba Estate; Church of Transfiguration, Ketu Badagry Expressway; Chaplain, Chapel of Light, Lagos State University 2006–2009. A Bishop Theologian, Church of Nigeria and Rector, Crowther Graduate Theological Seminary. He is married to Barrister Mrs. Harriet Seun Asaju with children. He was the Vice-Chancellor of Ajayi Crowther University for a period of five years.
