= Yesufu Lumu =

Anglican bishop in Nigeria (died 2018)

Yesufu Lumu is an Anglican bishop in Nigeria: he is a former Bishop of Dutse, one of ten dioceses within the Anglican Province of Kaduna, itself one of 14 provinces within the Church of Nigeria.

Lumu was elected Bishop of Dutse in 1996. He died in 2018.
