= Olubunmi Akinlade =

Anglican bishop in Nigeria

Olubunmi Akinlade is an Anglican bishop in Nigeria: he is the current Bishop of Ife. Olubunmi Adeyinka Akinlade was born on July 16, 1967, in Ibadan as the fourth and last child of the Rev. Canon Emmanuel Adeleke and Mrs. Elizabeth Adunola Akinlade, both of blessed memories. He hails from Osogbo town in Olorunda Local Government area of Osun State. His great grandfather released a portion of his land to the missionaries to settle in when they arrived Osogbo in 1900. The church established on the land is today the Cathedral of Osun Diocese (Anglican Communion).

== Education ==
He started his primary education at the Staff School, University of Ibadan, Ibadan, Oyo State. He relocated with his Father to Lagos in 1973 and continued his education at Ireti Primary School, Ikoyi Lagos from 1973 to 1977. In 1977, he gained admission to Government College, Ibadan, where he obtained his WAEC in 1983. He was admitted to the University of Lagos, Akoka, Lagos, in 1984 to study computer science, and in 1988 he graduated with a Bachelor of Science in Computer Sciences. He furthered his education at Ajayi Crowther University, Oyo, Oyo State, Nigeria, where he obtained a Postgraduate Diploma in Religious Studies (PGDRS) in 2023 and a Master of Arts (M.A.) in Christian Studies (Religious Ethics) in 2025.

== Career ==
He had his NYSC in Lagos while working with ICON Merchant Bank between 1988 and 1989. After his service year, he joined Management Assistance Services Limited in 1989 as a Systems Analyst and rose to the position of General Manager before leaving in 1995 to start his private consulting firm, POS Shop Ltd.

== Family Life ==
On the sixth day of August 1994, he married Nkechi Valentina Jibunoh, an English graduate who also holds a Master’s degree in International Law and Diplomacy from the University of Lagos and also a Chartered Secretary ACIS. The union is blessed with three children.

== Ministry Life ==
His journey in ministry began in 1997 when Ven. S.B. Akinola the then vicar of St. Peter's Anglican church Faji Lagos informed his home bishop, Bishop Fagbemi of Osun Diocese, that he has discovered a member of his congregation whom he is confident has a call over his life. Baba Fagbemi sent him to the Immanuel College in Ibadan from 1997 to 2001 for the TMM Course where he obtained a Diploma in Theology.

He was made a Deacon in Lagos in December 1999 by The Most Rev. Abiodun Adetiloye just before Baba Adetiloye retired that same month. He was posted to Church of the Resurrection, 1004 Estate as a curate and also served as the Youth chaplain. Sunday was a full day in that church. Despite being a Non-Stipendiary (NS) clergyman, he spent most of the evenings of the week and the whole of Wednesday at church. Seven months later in the year 2000, he was posted to Our Saviour’s Church, TBS, where he served for two years under the now-retired Bishop Odejide. He was in charge of the Businessmen’s Fellowship, the Hospital and Visitation Ministry, and the Prison Ministry at Our Saviour’s Church. In December 2002, he was posted to the VGC to pioneer a Church which began on January 1, 2003. Due to the prevailing circumstances (no place of worship, no money, and no congregation), his living room became the worship center, with he and his wife as congregants. As time went by, he began evensong and mid-week communion services. After three months, the evensong was converted to morning worship at a location outside the estate. The parish continues to grow and enjoy favour from God. A few years later, the church acquired a land within VGC but opposite VGC gate on which a multi-purpose complex was erected. The Anglican Church VGC now called Anglican Church of the Peninsula (ANCOPEN) was made an Archdeaconry seat eight years later, while he was transferred to Church of Resurrection 1004 as Curate. He served in this capacity from 2012 to November 2015, when he was elected Bishop of Ife. At this moment, he resigned from secular work by handing over control of his firm to his partner.

In January 2016, he was consecrated Bishop of Ife at Ughelli and enthroned in March 2016.

Rt. Rev. Olubunmi A. Akinlade’s major focus has been on rural evangelism since out of the 150 churches in the diocese over a hundred are in rural areas. He is focused on strengthening existing churches. With help from friends outside the diocese, over 17 dilapidated churches have been rebuilt. Boreholes are also drilled in various communities that were in dire need of them. The Diocesan Camp has also been given a major facelift with new hostels constructed to provide additional accommodation.

Since inception as the Diocesan Bishop of Ife, Rt. Rev. Olubunmi Akinlade has delivered several sermons and seminars.

== Service within the Church of Nigeria (CON) ==
Rt. Rev. Olubunmi A. Akinlade became actively involved with CON activities barely 4 years into his ministry when the church was to host the All African Bishops Conference at Archbishop Vining Memorial Cathedral Lagos. He was nominated into the secretariat Committee and charged with providing ICT support for the conference. He advocated for the provision of internet facility (Cyber Cafe) for delegates who require internet access. Considering the number of delegates (over 300) and the hassle of manual registration, he personally commissioned a colleague to develop an application to be deployed for the registration of delegates. The program gathered all relevant information about a delegate and generated registration tags. Needless to say, this application has been extensively utilized during synods in the diocese of Lagos over the years and continues to be used now. The application was also used for the Standing Committee Meetings that took place in the Diocese of Ife. It has also been utilized for the All Clergy Conference.

Rt. Rev. Olubunmi A. Akinlade has been a member of the DIVCCON planning committee since its inception, assisting Bishop Odubogun. He was initially in charge of registration and provided oversight for the entire secretariat committee. He now participates on the steering committee as a bishop and works closely with Archbishop Adeleye (Baba DIVCCON).

Rt. Rev. Olubunmi A. Akinlade can best be described as an ‘ICT Guru.’ He is responsible for training priests on ICT at the annual Senior Clergy Training Course in Agbara-Otor, since its inception. In 2020, he was invited by the Primate to oversee the computerization of the accounts of the Church of Nigeria (Anglican Communion). Based on his expertise as a parish priest and bishop using church administration software, he vetted the proposal of the company that had already been shortlisted by the then treasurer and provided them with further insight into what they needed to do to customize their application to meet the demands of CON. The application has been operating for over a year, and he continues to provide consulting services for this.

The work continues.
