= Anglican Diocese of Northern Izon =

Anglican diocese in Nigeria

The Anglican Diocese of Northern Izon is one of twelve dioceses within the Anglican Province of the Niger Delta, itself one of 14 ecclesiastical provinces within the Church of Nigeria. The current bishop is the Right Rev. Funkuro Godrules Victor Amgbare. The first bishop, Fred Anga Nyanabo, was consecrated on May 14, 2008 at St James's Cathedral, Oke-Bola, Ibadan and the missionary diocese was inaugurated on June 5 at St Mark's Cathedral, Kaiama, Bayelsa State.
