= Abiodun Olaoye =

Anglican bishop of Nigeria

Abiodun Taiwo Olaoye is an Anglican bishop in Nigeria: he was a Missionary bishop within the Anglican Province of Abuja and is now the Bishop of Osun North.
