= Jonathan Onyemelukwe =

Anglican bishop in Nigeria

Jonathan Arinzechukwu Onyemelukwe (1930–2011) was the Anglican Bishop On the Niger and Archbishop of Province Two of the Church of Nigeria in 2000.

Onyemelukwe, the Archbishop Emeritus of Province Two, former Dean, Church of Nigeria and Bishop on the Niger, died after a brief illness on 18 July 2011.

He was elected Bishop on the Niger in 1975, became Archbishop of Province Two in 1998 and retired in 2000.

He was born in Nanka-Aguata in Orumba North, Anambra State, on 30 May 1930 and was educated at Dennis Memorial Grammar School (DMGS). He graduated from Trinity College, Umuahia, from the University of Birmingham with an MA and from London University with a B.D.

He was a lecturer at Trinity College Umuahia from 1965 to 1966, became Archdeacon of Awka in 1970 and was Principal of Trinity College, Umuahia from 1971 until 1975.
