= Anglican Diocese of Ajayi Crowther =

Anglican diocese in Nigeria

Anglican Diocese of Ajayi Crowther is one of 17 dioceses within the Anglican Province of Ibadan, itself one of 14 ecclesiastical provinces within the Church of Nigeria. The current bishop is the Rt. Rev. Dr. Collins Olufemi Babalola who was consecrated by Primate Henry Ndukuba on 27 August 2023 and enthroned by Archbishop Adeoye of Ibadan province and other bishops.

The diocese hold the pride of being the only diocese named after any individual in the Church Of Nigeria (Anglican Communion). As it name implies, it was named after the legend of Evangelism of Nigeria, Bishop Samuel Ajayi Crowther, who also doubled as the first black slave cum bishop.
