= Anglican Diocese of Ahoada =

Anglican diocese in Nigeria

The Anglican Diocese of Ahoada is one of twelve dioceses within the Anglican Province of the Niger Delta, itself one of 14 ecclesiastical provinces within the Church of Nigeria. The current bishop is Clement Ekpeye.

The first church in the area, St. Paul's Niger Delta, was established at Ahoada in 1910. In 1925 a primary school was opened; and later a maternity home. In 1951 a vicarage was added. In 1952, a new Diocese Niger Delta was formed, with Ahoada and its surroundings included within it.

The Diocese of Ahoada was established in 2004 with St. Paul's becoming its cathedral, and Clement Ekpeye was its first bishop. Ekpeye was consecrated bishop on July 25, 2004, at the Cathedral Church of the Advent, Life Camp, Gwarinpa, Abuja.
