= Anglican Diocese of Osun North =

Anglican diocese in Nigeria

The Anglican Diocese of Osun North is one of 17 dioceses within the Anglican Province of Ibadan, itself one of 14 ecclesiastical provinces within the Church of Nigeria. The bishop is the Right Rev. Abiodun Olaoye.
