= Joseph Olusola =

Anglican bishop in Nigeria

Joseph A. F. Olusola is an Anglican bishop in Nigeria: he has been the Bishop of Ijesa North East in the Anglican Province of Ibadan since 2009.

Olusola was elected as the pioneer Bishop of the new Anglican Diocese of Ijesa North East on 29 October 2009 at the Episcopal synod of the Church of Nigeria Anglican Communion held at the Basilica of Grace Apo in Gudu district of the Anglican Diocese of Abuja.
