= Anglican Diocese of Oke-Ogun =

Anglican diocese in Nigeria

The Anglican Diocese of Oke-Ogun is one of 17 dioceses within the Anglican Province of Ibadan, itself one of 14 ecclesiastical provinces within the Church of Nigeria. The current bishop is the Right Rev. Cornelius Adagbada.
