= Oluwagbemiro Fabuluje =

Anglican bishop of Nigeria

Oluwagbemiro Fabuluje is the Anglican Bishop of Oke-Osun in Ibadan Province of the Church of Nigeria.

He was elected as Bishop in January 2021.

His father Jeremiah Fabuluje, who died in 2008, was Bishop of Kwara.

Fabuluje graduated from Obafemi Awolowo University in 1995 and from Immanuel College, Ibadan in 1997. He was made a deacon in December 1999, at the Cathedral of All Saints, Balogun Agoro, Osogbo. He had been Archdeacon of the Osun Diocese before becoming bishop.
