= Jacob Ajetunmobi =

Anglican Bishop in Nigeria (1948–2020)

Jacob Ademola Ajetunmobi (June 1948 – 14 December 2020) was a Nigerian Anglican bishop. He was the first bishop of the Diocese of Ibadan South from 1999 to 2018.

Ajetunmobi was born in 1948 in Ogbagi-Akoko in Western Nigeria to a chief who was a polygamist and to a princess from a neighbouring tribe. After his school education, he started studying agriculture at the School of Agriculture in Akure, but, having become a Christian at a Scripture Union camp in 1966, he gave up agriculture studies and enrolled in the Igbaja Seminary, run by the Sudan Interior Mission. On graduating from Igbaja, he studied at the London Bible College. Returning to Nigeria he then taught in schools and colleges and worked for Scripture Union.

He was ordained both deacon and priest in 1983. Initially he was Chaplain to Bishop G.I.O. Olajide, the Bishop of Ilesa. In 1988 he moved again to London, as Chaplain to the Nigerian Chaplaincy.

He was consecrated Bishop at Christ Church, Uwari, Enugu, on 11 July 1999 by Abiodun Adetiloye, Primate of the Church of Nigeria, the first bishop of the Diocese of Ibadan South, a post he held until his retirement in 2018.

He died in 2020, aged 72.
