= Jacob Ola Fasipe =

Anglican bishop in Nigeria

Jacob Ola Fasipe was an Anglican bishop in Nigeria: he was Bishop of Oyo until he was succeeded on his retirement by Williams Oluwarotimi Aladekugbe in 2014.

Fasipe was educated at Immanuel College of Theology, Ibadan and Trinity College, Dublin.

He was enthroned as the pioneer Bishop of Oyo in 2004.
