= Anglican Diocese of Etche =

Anglican diocese in Nigeria

The Anglican Diocese of Etche is one of thirteen within the Anglican Province of the Niger Delta, itself one of 14 ecclesiastical provinces within the Church of Nigeria. The current bishop is the Right Rev. Precious Nwala. Nwala was consecrated a bishop on March 4, 2007 at the Cathedral of the Advent, Abuja; and the missionary diocese was inaugurated on March 19 at St Matthias' Cathedral, Okomoko/Egwi, Etche.
