= Anglican Diocese of Kabba =

Anglican diocese in Nigeria

The Anglican Diocese of Kabba is one of eleven within the Anglican Province of Lokoja, itself one of 14 ecclesiastical provinces within the Church of Nigeria. The current bishop is the Right Rev. Steven Akobe, who was consecrated a bishop on 12 September 2010 at St Peter's Cathedral, Asaba.
