= Anglican Diocese of Nsukka =

Anglican diocese in Nigeria

Coordinates: 6°51′24″N 7°23′45″E

The Anglican Diocese of Nsukka is one of 12 within the Anglican Province of Enugu, itself one of 14 ecclesiastical provinces within the Church of Nigeria. The current bishop is the Right Rev. Aloysius Agbo
