= Isaac Oluyamo =

Anglican bishop in Nigeria

Rt. Rev. (Dr) Isaac Oluyamo is an Anglican bishop in Nigeria: a former archdeacon he has been the Bishop of Ijesha North since 2015.
