= Anglican Diocese of Ibadan North =

Anglican diocese in Nigeria

The Anglican Diocese of Ibadan North is one of 17 dioceses within the Anglican Province of Ibadan, which is one of 14 ecclesiastical provinces within the Church of Nigeria. The current bishop is the Most Revd. Dr. Segun Okubadejo who incidentally is also the Archbishop of the Anglican Province of Ibadan.

The cathedral for the Anglican Diocese of Ibadan North is the Cathedral Church of St. Peter located at Aremo Area of Ibadan, the Capital of Oyo State, Nigeria. The Very Reverend Dr. Adewale Adebiyi is the Provost of the Cathedral.
