= Anglican Diocese of Wusasa =

Anglican diocese in Nigeria

The Anglican Diocese of Wusasa is one of eleven within the Anglican Province of Kaduna, itself one of 14 ecclesiastical provinces within the Church of Nigeria. The current bishop is the Right Rev. Ali Buba Lamido who is also the Archbishop of the Province.
