= Anglican Diocese of Ogbomoso =

Anglican diocese in Nigeria

The Anglican Diocese of Ogbomoso is one of 17 within the Anglican Province of Ibadan, itself one of 14 ecclesiastical provinces within the Church of Nigeria. The current bishop is the Right Rev. Matthew Osunade.

The diocese was established in 2005.
