= Joseph Akinyele Omoyajowo =

Anglican bishop in Nigeria

Joseph Akinyele Omoyajowo was the Anglican Bishop of Ijebu in Province One of the Church of Nigeria from 1999 until his retirement in 2004.

He was born on 31 December 1934 in Isarun, Ondo. Omoyajowo was Professor of Religious Studies at Obafemi Awolowo University. He was the pioneer Bishop of Ikale-Ilaje (renamed to Bishop of On the Coast) before being posted to Ijebu.

He attended St. John's College, Owo, from 1953 to 1958 and Immanuel College of Theology, Ibadan, from 1961 to 1963. He was at the University of Ibadan from 1963 to 1970 and Southern Methodist University, Dallas, Texas, USA, from 1968 until 1969. He was a lecturer at the University of Ibadan from 1970 till 1975, and became Professor of Religious Studies at Obafemi Awolowo University in 1981.

He is a prolific author; his books include Itan Adegbesan 1959 / 1961, NOK Publishers New York, the first detective story written in a native African Language. Bishop Isaac Oyelaja Sonola Okunsanya: His Life and Time and Cherubim and Seraphim: The History of an African Independent Church.
