= Anglican Diocese of Osun =

Anglican diocese in Nigeria

The Anglican Diocese of Osun is one of 17 dioceses within the Anglican Province of Ibadan, itself one of 14 ecclesiastical provinces within the Church of Nigeria. The bishop emeritus is James Afolabi Popoola and the current bishop is the Right Rev. Foluso Olugbenga Babatunji.

The Diocese of Osun was inaugurated on 3 August 1987, and Seth Oni Fagbemi was enthroned at All Saints’ Cathedral, Balogun, Osogbo, as the pioneer bishop.

== Bishops ==
Name	Years
Seth Oni Fagbemi	1987–2000
James Afolabi Popoola	2000–2019
Foluso Olugbenga Babatunji	2019–
