= Anglican Diocese of Ilesa South West =

Anglican diocese in Nigeria

The Anglican Diocese of Ilesa South West is one of 19 dioceses within the Anglican Province of Ibadan, itself one of 14 ecclesiastical provinces within the Church of Nigeria. The pioneer bishop is Samuel Egbebunmi. (January 2009 to April 2025). Currently, the Bishop is the Rt Revd Dr Adebola Ayodeji Ojofeitimi, consecrated and enthroned September 16th and 27th respectively.
