= Akintunde Popoola =

Anglican bishop of Nigeria

Akintunde Popoola is an Anglican bishop in Nigeria: he was Bishop of the Offa diocese until 2018 and is now the incumbent of Ibadan South.
