= Anglican Diocese of Ibadan =

Anglican diocese in Nigeria

The Anglican Diocese of Ibadan is one of 17 dioceses within the Anglican Province of Ibadan, itself one of 14 ecclesiastical provinces within the Church of Nigeria. The current bishop is the Right Rev. Joseph Akinfenwa. The Cathedral of St James the Great (Oke-bola Ibadan), is the seat of the Bishop of the Diocese of Ibadan.
