= Anglican Diocese of Oyo =

Anglican diocese in Nigeria

The Anglican Diocese of Oyo is one of 19 within the Anglican Province of Ibadan, itself one of 14 ecclesiastical provinces within the Church of Nigeria. The Bishop Emeritus is Jacob Ola Fasipe; and the current bishop is the Right Rev. Dr. Olugbenga Oduntan. In November 2025, the Diocese of Oyo South was created.
