= Anglican Diocese of Kafanchan =

Anglican diocese in Nigeria

Coordinates: 9°34′N 8°18′E

The Anglican Diocese of Kafanchan is one of 13 dioceses within the Anglican Province of Abuja, itself one of 14 ecclesiastical provinces within the Church of Nigeria. The current bishop is the Right Rev. Marcus Dogo
