= Segun Okubadejo =

Anglican bishop in Nigeria

Segun Okubadejo is an Anglican bishop in Nigeria, the current Bishop of Ibadan North and Archbishop of Ibadan Province.

He has been Bishop of Ibadan North since its creation in 1998.

He became Archbishop of the Province of Ibadan on 19 January 2013.
