= Anglican Diocese of Ibadan South =

Anglican diocese in Nigeria

The Anglican Diocese of Ibadan South is one of 17 dioceses within the Anglican Province of Ibadan, itself one of 14 ecclesiastical provinces within the Church of Nigeria. The current bishop is the Right Rev. Akintunde Popoola.

The first bishop of the diocese was Jacob Ajetunmobi, who was Bishop from 1999 until his retirement in 2018.
