= Anglican Diocese of Isi Mbano =

Anglican diocese in Nigeria

The Anglican Diocese of Isi Mbano (formerly Okigwe North) is one of 12 dioceses within the Anglican Province of Owerri, itself one of 14 ecclesiastical provinces within the Church of Nigeria. The current bishop is the Right Rev. Godson Udochukwu Ukanwa.
