= Anglican Diocese of Ijesha North Missionary =

Anglican diocese in Nigeria

The Anglican Missionary Diocese of Ijesha North is one of 17 dioceses within the Anglican Province of Ibadan, itself one of 14 ecclesiastical provinces within the Church of Nigeria. The current bishop is Isaac Oluyamo.
