= Anglican Diocese of Ijesa North East =

Anglican diocese in Nigeria

The Anglican Diocese of Ijesa North East is one of 17 dioceses within the Anglican Province of Ibadan, itself one of 14 ecclesiastical provinces within the Church of Nigeria. The current bishop is the Right Rev. Joseph Olusola, who was elected as the pioneer bishop in 2009.
