= Anglican Diocese of Ondo =

Anglican diocese in Nigeria

The Anglican Diocese of Ondo is one of twelve dioceses within the Anglican Province of Ondo, itself one of 14 ecclesiastical provinces within the Church of Nigeria. The current bishop is the Right Rev. Stephen Oni.
