= Anglican Diocese of Ilesa =

Anglican diocese in Nigeria

The Anglican Diocese of Ilesa is the second most senior diocese of 17 dioceses within the Anglican Province of Ibadan, itself one of 14 ecclesiastical provinces within the Church of Nigeria. The current bishop is Dapo Folorunsho Asaju.

Samuel Olubayo Sowale was the immediate past dishop from year 2000 to 2021

Ephraim Ademowo was bishop of the diocese from 1989 to 2000.
