= Anglican Diocese of Jalingo =

Anglican diocese in Nigeria

The Anglican Diocese of Jalingo is one of ten dioceses within the Anglican Province of Jos, itself one of 14 ecclesiastical provinces within the Church of Nigeria. The current bishop is the Right Rev. Foreman Nedison.
