= Anglican Diocese of Dutse =

Anglican diocese in Nigeria

The Anglican Diocese of Dutse is one of eleven dioceses within the Anglican Province of Kaduna, itself one of fourteen ecclesiastical provinces of the Church of Nigeria. The current bishop is the Right Rev. Markus Yohanna Danbinta.
