= Anglican Diocese of Oke-Osun =

Anglican diocese in Nigeria

The Anglican Diocese of Oke-Osun is one of 17 dioceses within the Anglican Province of Ibadan, itself one of 14 ecclesiastical provinces within the Church of Nigeria. The Bishop Emeritus is Abraham Akinlalu who was succeeded by Foluso Taiwo in 2019. Taiwo died in November 2020, and was succeeded by the Right Rev. Oluwagbemiro Fabuluje, elected in January 2021.
