= Anglican Diocese of Ife =

Anglican diocese in Nigeria

The Anglican Diocese of Ife is one of 17 dioceses within the Anglican Province of Ibadan, which is one of 14 ecclesiastical provinces within the Church of Nigeria. The current bishop is the Right Rev. Olubunmi Akinlade.

The Ife District Church Council was inaugurated in 1903 by the Right Rev. Charles Phillips, Assistant Bishop of Lagos who was stationed at Ondo. In 1919, Bishop Phillips established the Ife District Church Council, consolidating all Anglican Churches in the Ife division into this organization.
