= Anglican Diocese of Sokoto =

Anglican diocese in Nigeria

The Anglican Diocese of Sokoto is one of eleven dioceses within the Anglican Province of Kaduna, itself one of 14 ecclesiastical provinces within the Church of Nigeria. The immediate past bishop is the late Rt. Rev. Augustine Omole who died in April 2021.

In early 2026, the current bishop is the Rt. Rev. Idris Zubairu who was translated from the Diocese of Bari to Sokoto diocese.
