= Anglican Diocese of Offa =

Anglican diocese in Nigeria

The Anglican Diocese of Offa is one of eight within the Anglican Province of Kwara, itself one of 14 ecclesiastical provinces within the Church of Nigeria. The last bishop was Akintunde Popoola; and the incumbent is the Right Rev. Solomon Olusola Akanbi.
