= Anglican Diocese of Lagos West =

Anglican diocese in Nigeria

Diocese of Lagos West

Location
- Ecclesiastical province: Church of Nigeria
- Archdeaconries: 30

Statistics
- Parishes: 275

Information
- Rite: Anglican
- Cathedral: Archbishop Vining Memorial Church Cathedral, Ikeja

Current leadership
- Bishop: James Odedeji

Website
- Diocese of Lagos West Official Website

The Diocese of Lagos West is one of the 13 dioceses of the Anglican Province of Lagos, in the Church of Nigeria (Anglican Communion). It comprises 30 archdeaconries. The diocese's cathedral is Archbishop Vining Memorial Church Cathedral, in Ikeja. The diocese was inaugurated at 20 November 1999. The first bishop was Peter Awelewa Adebiyi, who served as bishop from the diocese's creation in 2000 until 2013. The current bishop is James Odedeji.

The Diocese of Lagos West currently comprises 29 archdeaconries: Abule Egba, Agege, Amuwo Odofin, Bariga, Egbe, Festac, Gowon Estate, Iba, Idimu, Ijede, Iju-Ishaga, Ikeja, Ikorodu, Ikorodu-North, Ikosi-Ketu, Ikotun, Imota, Ipaja, Isolo, Ogudu, Ojo, Ojo-Alaba, Ojodu, Opebi, Oshodi, Oto Awori, Owutu, Satellite, and Somolu.
