= Olubayu Sowale =

Anglican bishop in Nigeria (born 1951)

Samuel Olubayo Sowale is an Anglican bishop in Nigeria: he is the current Bishop of Ilesa.

Sowale was born in 1951 at Isara-Remo and educated at the University of Ibadan and the University of British Columbia. He was ordained a deacon in 1977 and a priest a year later. He became canon in 1987, archdeacon in 1992, provost in 1993 and was elected and consecrated Bishop of Ilesa in 2000.
