= Olusola =

Olúṣọlá
- Gender: Unisex
- Language: Yoruba

Origin
- Origin: Nigerian
- Meaning: The lord makes wealth.
- Region of origin: South West, Nigeria

Olúṣọlá audio is a Nigerian given name and a surname. It is a unisex name and of Yoruba origin, which means "The lord makes wealth". The diminutive form can be Olú or Sọlá.

== Given name ==
- Atinuke Olusola Adebanji Nigerian-Ghanaian statistician
- Olusola Adesope, Nigerian academic
- Olusola Adeyeye, Nigerian biologist and politician
- Solomon Olusola Akanbi, Nigerian Anglician bishop
- Olusola Amusan (born 1990), Nigerian social entrepreneur
- Olusola Awosina (born 1970), Nigerian weightlifter
- Olusola Friday (born 1990), Nigerian weightlifter
- Grace Olusola Gbotosho, Nigerian pharmacologist
- Olusola Kehinde, Nigerian academic
- Olusola Momoh, Nigerian media executive
- Olusola Obada (born 1951), Nigerian lawyer and politician
- Adesegun Olusola Ogunlewe (born 1953), Nigerian politician
- Olayinka Olusola Omigbodun, Nigerian academic
- Olusola Idris Osolo (born 1988), Oba of Ado and Olofin Adimula Oodua of Ado-Odo
- Olusola Bandele Oyewole (born 1955), Nigerian academic
- Babajide Olusola Sanwo-Olu (born 1965), Nigerian politician
- Olusola Saraki (1933–2012), Nigerian politician
- Olusola Teniola (born 1966), Nigerian businessman
- Olusola Odeyomi (born 1989), Nigerian Professor at North Carolina A & T State University

== Surname ==
- Dupe Olusola, Nigerian business executive
- Joseph Olusola, Nigerian Anglician bishop
- Kevin Olusola (born 1988), Nigerian–American singer-songwriter, beatboxer and cellist
- Olusegun Olusola (1935–2012), Nigerian television producer
- Taye Olusola, member of Twins Affair
