= Vice-Chancellor of Federal University of Agriculture, Abeokuta =

- Incumbent; Professor Olusola Kehinde since 1 November 2022
- Type: Educational
- Nominator: FUNAAB Governing Council
- Appointer: Nigeria Federal Government
- Term length: Single term of 5 years
- Precursor: Ololade Ade Enikuomehin
- First holder: Nurudeen Olorunimbe Adedipe

The Vice-Chancellor of Federal University of Agriculture, Abeokuta, Nigeria is the executive head of the University. Upon the VC's appointment by the governing council, the VC has the overall responsibility for the policy and administration of the University. Professor Olusola Kehinde served as the Acting Vice-Chancellor of Federal University of Agriculture, Abeokuta from 1 November, 2022 to 31 March, 2023, and was appointed as the 7th substantive Vice-Chancellor from 1 April, 2023.

== Past Vice-Chancellors ==
- Nurudeen Olorunimbe Adedipe (1988–1995)
- Julius Amioba Okojie (1996–2001)
- Israel Folorunso Adu (2001–2006)
- Ishola Adamson (2006–2007)
- Oluwafemi Olaiya Balogun (2007–2012)
- Olusola Bamidele Oyewole (2012–2017)
- Ololade Ade Enikuomehin (May 2017 – October 2017)
- Felix Kolawole Salako (2017–2022)
- Olusola Kehinde (acting) (2022–present)
