= Oyewole =

Oyewole is a surname. Notable people with the surname include:

- Abiodun Oyewole (born 1948), American musician
- Adessoye Oyewole (born 1982), Russian footballer
- Olusola Bandele Oyewole (born 1955), Nigerian professor
- Saundra Herndon Oyewole (born 1943), American microbiologist
- Ayodeji John Oyewole (born 2004), Nigerian Petroleum Engineer
