= Adebanji =

Adebanji is a surname. Notable people with the surname include:

- Atinuke Olusola Adebanji, Nigerian–Ghanaian statistician
- Stephen Adebanji Akintoye (born 1935), Nigerian-born academic

== See also ==
- Adebanjo
