= Monzor Olowosago =

Nigerian journalist and publisher

Monzor Olowosago is a journalist and the publisher of Oriwu Sun Community Newspaper based in Ikorodu, a sub-urban town, some 32 kilometres north east of Ikeja, the capital of Lagos State, Nigeria's commercial capital. The newspaper has been publishing without break for 36 years, since 1985, making it the foremost community newspaper in Nigeria

== History ==
Monzor Olowosago was born on April 25, 1951. He clocked 70 on April 25, 2021, and he was congratulated by the President of the Federal Republic of Nigeria, President Muhammadu Buhari. He has been publishing the community newspaper for 40 years going.

Monzor Olowosago attended the London College of Journalism. While in London, he lived in North London. His stay in North London aroused his curiosity about community reporting. It was in London that he noticed that apart from the national and city newspapers, there were newspapers specifically serving communities and he decided that when he gets back home to Nigeria, he would set up a community newspaper in Ikorodu Division.

He graduated from the journalism school in London 1977, and has never ventured into any other profession apart from Journalism.

== Career ==
On arrival in Nigeria, Monsur Olowosago worked at National Concord newspaper. The Concord newspaper was founded in 1980, and he applied to work there; he was employed to work under the late Dele Giwa as a Sub-Editor. He worked with the Concord Newspaper for Five years before he decided to start his community newspaper Oriwu Sun Community Newspaper. He started the production of the paper in 1985, which was on his birthday. He started the newspaper with two full time staff and three part time reporters. The operation was from his father's house in Ikorodu. He started production of the paper with 20 pages black and white. Today they produce more than 100 pages, all colour per edition

== Community service ==
Alhaji Monzor Olowosago contributes to his community in Ikorodu. He is the patron of Lagos State Community Journalists and practitioners and he donated a 3-classroom block to Estate Primary School in Ikorodu. He also built a Mosque within the premises of the newly built NASFAT Health Centre in Ikorodu.
