= Olayinka Ramota Karim =

Nigerian Food Scientist and Vice Chancellor Fountain Universities

Olayinka Ramota Karim FNIFST

4th Vice-Chancellor of the Fountain University
- Incumbent
- Assumed office 1 March 2023

Personal details
- Born: Olayinka Ramota Karim; 18 March 1968 (age 58)
- Education: Federal University of Agriculture, Abeokuta (B.Sc); University of Ibadan (M.Sc); Federal University of Agriculture, Abeokuta (PhD)
- Profession: Food Scientist
- Website: agriculture.unilorin.edu.ng/prof-mrs-olayinka-ramota-karim

Olayinka Ramota Karim FNIFST Olayinka Ramota Karim.ogg(born 18 March 1968) is a Nigerian professor of food science and the 4th substantive vice-chancellor of Fountain University Osogbo.

== Early life and education ==
Olayinka Ramota Karim was born in Ijebu Ode, Ogun State. She attended Ansarudeen Primary School between 1975 and Muslim Girls' High School, both at Ijebu-ode. She is a Graduate Of Federal University of Agriculture, Abeokuta (FUNAAB), Ogun State where she obtained her Bachelor of Science in Food Science and Technology in 1992. In 1995 she completed her Master of Science in food technology from University of Ibadan, Oyo State. and her Doctor of Philosophy in food science and technology (food processing and quality control) in 2005 also from FUNAAB. She is the national treasurer of the Nigerian Institute of Food Science and Technology (NIFST).

== Career ==
She joined the service of University of Ilorin, as a senior lecturer in 2008, Department of Home Economics and Food Science. On Monday, 9 January 2023, the Council Chairman and Pro-Chancellor of the University, Dr. Awa Ibraheem announced the appointment of Professor Olayinka Ramota Karim as the 4th substantial Vice-Chancellor of the University.
