= Bashiru Ademola Raji =

Nigerian professor and academic

Bashiru Ademola Raji FAAS, FSSSN
- Education: Ahmadu Bello University, International Institute for Aerospace Survey and Earth Science (ITC) in Enschede, Netherlands.
- Occupations: Soil scientist; Academic administration
- Notable work: He is the president of the Soil Science Society of Nigeria.Former Vice chancellor of Fountain University, Osogbo.
- Term: December 2012–present
- Predecessor: Bukoye Oloyede
- Successor: Professor Amidu Olalekan Sanni

Bashiru Ademola Raji , FAAS is a Nigerian professor of soil science, Pedologist, geologist, environmental impact assessment expert and the former Vice chancellor of Fountain University, Osogbo.

He was the second substantive Vice chancellor of the University. His research interest is in the area of soil survey, Land-use planning, environmental impact assessment of natural resource utilization and Pedology, the study of soils in their natural environment. It deals with Pedogenesis, the science and study of the processes that lead to the formation of soil and first explored by the Russian geologist Vasily Dokuchaev.

He is the president of the Soil Science Society of Nigeria.

== Higher education ==
He obtained a Bachelor of Science and Master of Science degree in Geology before he received a Doctorate in soil science from Ahmadu Bello University, Zaria. He later obtained a postgraduate diploma in soil survey from the International Institute for Aerospace Survey and Earth Science (ITC) in Enschede, Netherlands.

== Background ==
Bashiru Ademola Raji obtained a Bachelor of Science and Master of Science degree in Geology before he received a Doctorate in soil science from Ahmadu Bello University, Zaria. He later obtained a postgraduate diploma in soil survey from the International Institute for Aerospace Survey and Earth Science (ITC) in Enschede, Netherlands. He began his academic career at Ahmadu Bello University where he became a professor of soil science and served as Dean of student affairs. He served as Assistant Dean of Postgraduate School, Faculty of Agriculture from 2003 - 2005 before he was appointed as Dean of student affairs. Prior to this, he was Head of the department of soil science, faculty of agriculture, and the director of academic planning and monitoring unit of the university from 2006 to 2008. In 2003, he became a member of Ahmadu Bello University Senate representative of the Governing Board of National Agricultural Extension Research Liaison Services and served in that capacity for two years. He was formerly a visiting professor at the University of Ilorin where he coordinated the department of forest resources management for two years (2013 - 2013). In December 2012, he was appointed as the second substantive Vice chancellor of Fountain University. He succeeded Professor Bukoye Oloyede, the pioneer Vice chancellor of the University.

== Honours and recognition ==
Raji is a fellow of the African Scientific Institute and fellow of the Soil Science Society of Nigeria. He is the President of the Soil Science Society of Nigeria.

== See also ==
- List of Vice-chancellors of Nigerian universities
