= Adebambo =

Nigerian Given Name

Adébámbọ̀
- Gender: Unisex
- Language: Yoruba

Origin
- Language: Nigerian
- Meaning: Royalty returned with me
- Region of origin: Southwest

Other names
- Short form: Bámbọ̀

Adébámbọ̀ audio is a unisex Yoruba given name meaning "Royalty returned with me", popular in the Southwestern region of Nigeria. Bámbọ̀ is the diminutive form for Adébámbọ̀.

== Notable people bearing the name ==
- Jean Adebambo, British Singer (1962–2009)
- Ayoka Olufunmilayo Adebambo, Nigerian Scientist
