= Adebanjo =

Adebanjo is a surname. Notable people with the surname include:

- Ayo Adebanjo (1928–2025), Nigerian lawyer, and nationalist
- Jacob Adebanjo (born 1993), Nigerian footballer
- Olufemi Adebanjo, Nigerian politician
- Seyi Adebanjo, Nigerian artist

== See also ==
- Adebanji
- Meet the Adebanjos, sitcom
