= Funmi Ayinke =

Nigerian businesswoman & Politician

Funmilayo Waheed-Adekojo
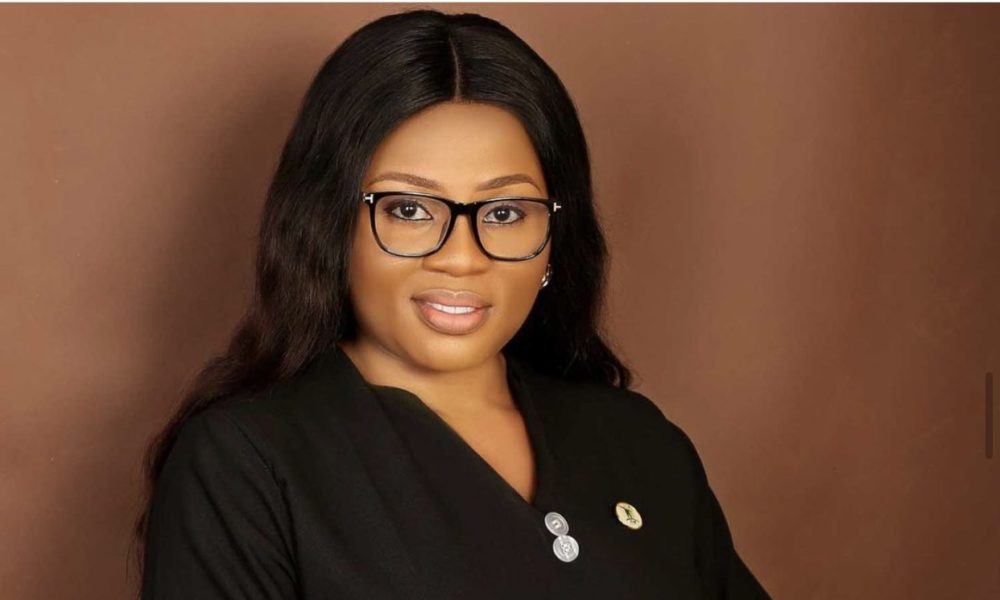

Personal details
- Born: 27 May 1983 (age 42) Akoko, Ondo state, Nigeria
- Education: Ladoke Akintola University of Technology
- Website: funmiayinke.com

Funmilayo Waheed-Adekojo (born 27 May 1983) is a Nigerian business mogul, philanthropist, Politician, educationalist and industrialist. She is the founder and Chief Executive Officer of Funmi Ayinke Nigeria Limited and the Funmi Ayinke Music Record Label (FRL)

== Early life and education ==
Funmi Waheed-Adekojo was born on 27 May 1983. She attended Ladoke Akintola University of Technology, where she earned a Bachelor of Technology (B.Tech.) degree in Mechanical engineering. She also holds a master of Business Administration (MBA).

== Career ==
Waheed-Adekojo began her career with the National Youth Service Corps at the Ministry of Work and Housing, Gumel, Jigawa State. After nine months, she redeployed to the Works and Services Department of the Federal University of Agriculture, Abeokuta (FUNAAB), Ogun State.

She joined the Mechanical Engineering Unit of FUNAAB's Works and Services Department in February 2014.

In 2019, after leaving FUNAAB, Funmi established her own company, Funmi Ayinke Nigeria Limited. She also launched her own record label, Funmi Ayinke Music Record Label (FRL) in October 2021, signing three artists from Lagos. Her first time singing was in a church choir. Her first release, "It's Our Time", was inspired by the "End SARS" protests in Nigeria.

== Awards and honors ==
- Funmi Ayinke won two West Africa Gospel Music Awards in 2021 for the Best Inspirational Song of the Year and the Best Songwriter of the year for 2020/2021, and won the City People Magazine Awards for Best Motivational song of the Year and Songwriter of the Year.
- She was awarded the "Humanitarian of the Year 2020" award by City People.
- Ayinke became a brand ambassador for Nord Automobiles in 2022.
- Funmi Ayinke bags Peace Corps ambassadorial appointment.
- Re-engineering Life via mechanics and music
- Funmi Ayinke set to release EP
- Award For Global Excellence Leadership And Corporate Enterprise, London, 2023
- Engr. Dr. Funmi Ayinke Wins ‘Emerging CEO Of The Year’ Award In London
- Engr. Dr. Funmilayo Waheed-Adekojo Shines at the Golden Star Award 2023
- Engr. Dr. Funmilayo Waheed-Adekojo conferred as Matron of APPON

== Personal life ==
Funmi Ayinke is married with four children.
