= Awa Ibraheem =

Chairman ICMA and Pro-Chancelor of Fountain University Osogbo

Awa Ibrahim
- Born: 19 October 1953 (age 72)
- Education: Ahmadu Bello University
- Occupation: Chartered Accountant
- Title: Pro-Chancelor Fountain University Osogbo
- Board member of: Integrated Consultancy Management Accountants

Awa Ibrahim (born October 19, 1953) is a Nigerian businessman and Pro-Chancellor of Fountain University Osogbo. Dr Ibrahim is a Chartered Accountant and the Chairman of ICMA (Integrated Consultancy Management Accountants) Services Limited.

== Early life and education ==
Dr Ibrahim was born to the Ibrahim family of Akewusola Compound in Offa Kwara State, Nigeria. He graduated from the University of Lagos in 1982 with a B.Sc degree in Accounting and earned his Master's Degree in Finance from Ahmadu Bello University, Zaria in 1999. He also holds a PhD in Management Science from the University of Ilorin and is an alumnus of Harvard Business School, Strathclyde University (UK), and ILO Institute in Turin, Italy.

== Career ==
He is a member of the board of many companies, including Port Harcourt Electricity Distribution Company Limited, Oceanic Health Management Company Limited, Express Portfolio Services Limited, Prime Metro Properties Limited, Afrocommerce (WA) Limited, and HF Schroeder (WA) Limited.

== Member ==
Dr Ibrahim is a fellow member of the Institute of Chartered Accountants of Nigeria.

He has received recognition for his work, including being celebrated as a "Notable Member" by ICAN, and his appointment as the Pro-Chancellor of Fountain University Osogbo.
