= Fountain University =

Private university in Osogbo, Osun, Nigeria

Fountain University, Osogbo
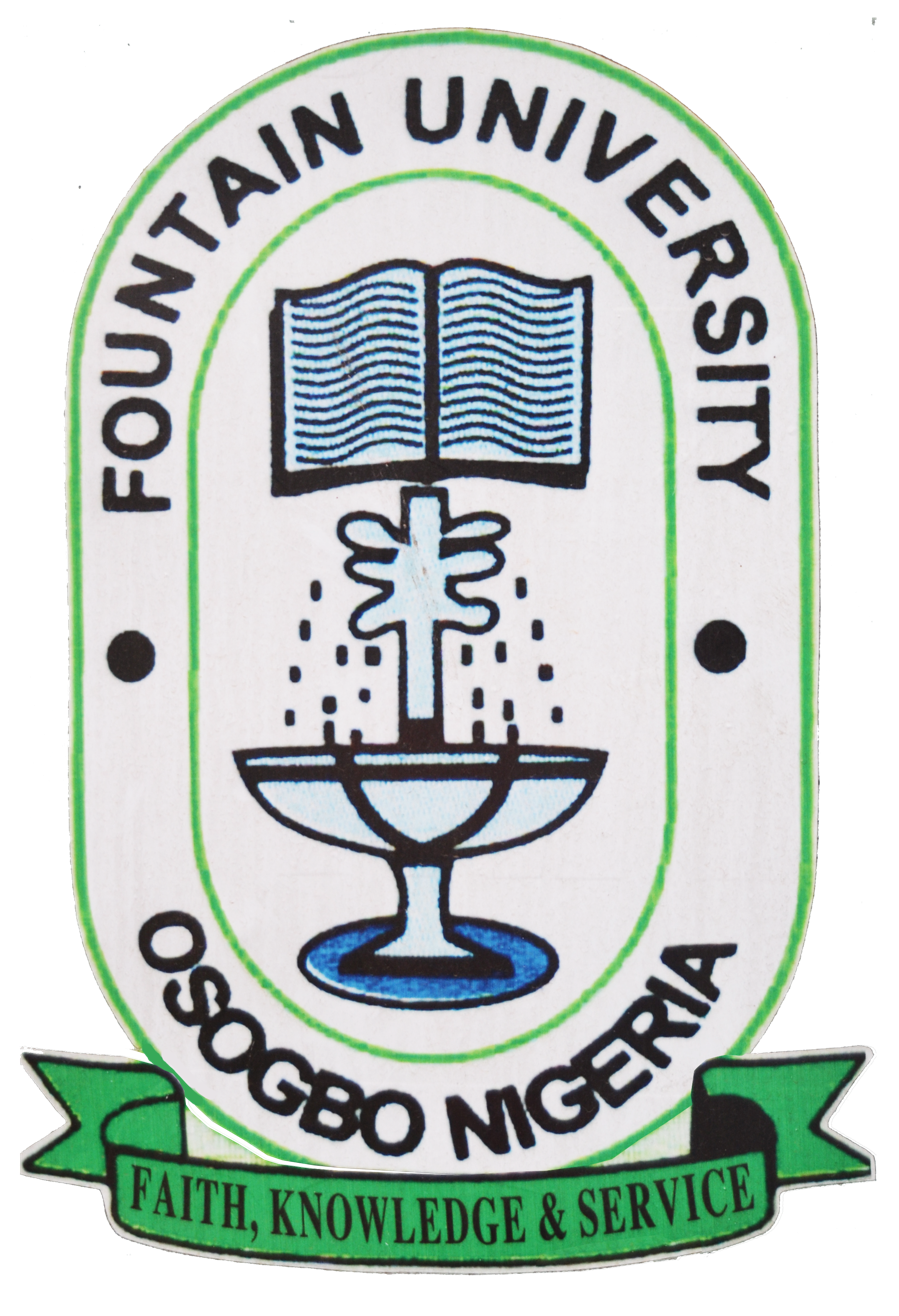
- Senate Building, Fountain University, Osogbo
- Motto: "Knowledge, Faith and Leadership"
- Type: Private research university
- Established: 2007; 19 years ago
- Founder: NASFAT
- Accreditation: NUC
- Affiliations: AAU
- Religious affiliation: Nasrul-Lahi-L-Fatih Society (NASFAT)
- Chancellor: Alh. Umaru Mutallab CON
- Vice-Chancellor: Professor Olayinka Ramota Karim
- Faculty: 178
- Students: 3887
- Location: Oke-Osun, P.M.B. 4491, Osogbo, Osun State, Nigeria, Osogbo, Osun, Nigeria
- Campus: Suburban
- Colours: Green and Mint
- Website: Official website
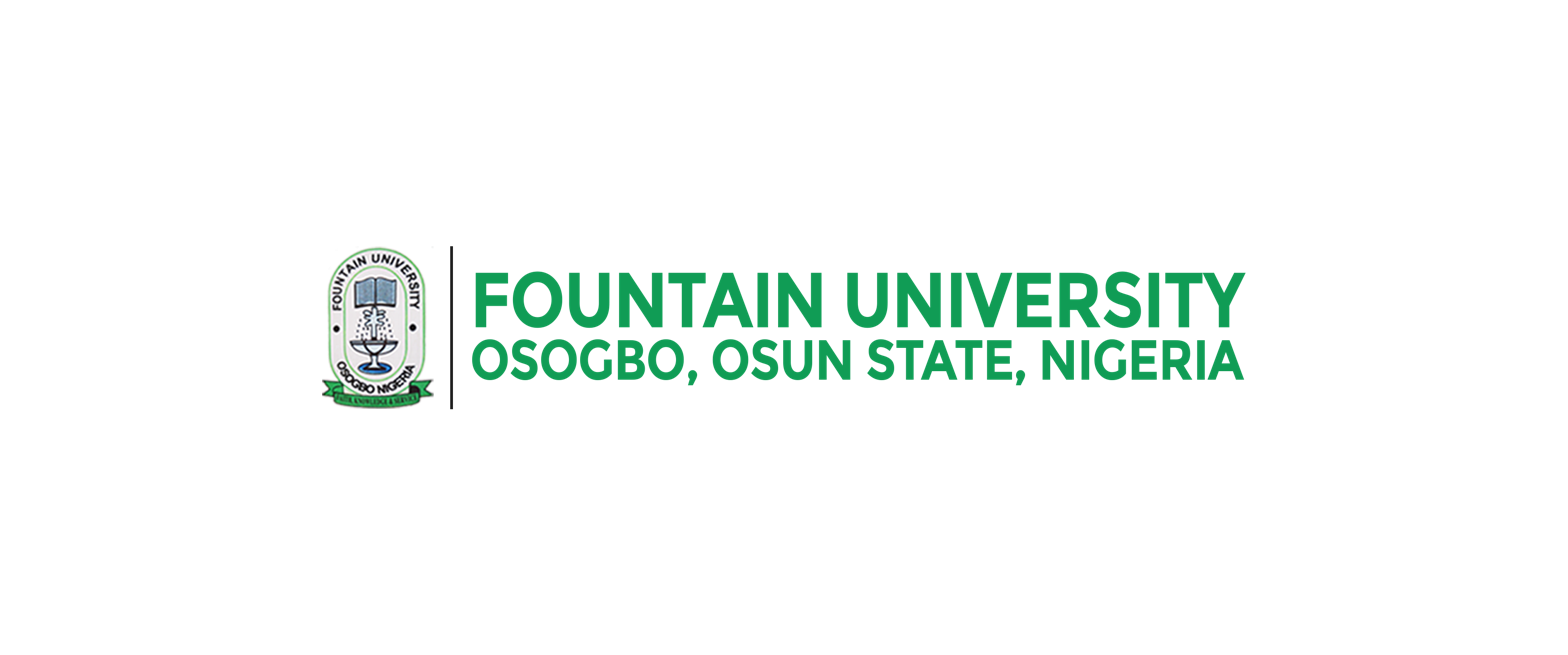

Fountain University (FUO) is a private university in Osogbo, Osun State, Nigeria, established to provide education grounded in Islamic principles.

Originally established as the University of Nasrul-lahi-li Fatih Society by the Nasrul-lahi-li Fatih (NASFAT) Society on May 17, 2007, the university currently comprises five colleges: the College of Basic Medical and Health Sciences, the College of Natural and Applied Sciences, the College of Management and Social Sciences, the College of Law, and the College of Arts. Proposals for Colleges of Engineering and Education are under consideration.

The university also hosts a School of Postgraduate Studies offering active programs for postgraduate diplomas, master's degrees, and Doctor of Philosophy (Ph.D.) programs.

== History ==
The formation of Nasrul-Lahi-l-Fatih Society of Nigeria NASFAT the proprietor of Fountain University was originally focused on prayer meetings for the Muslim elites, with a view to creating opportunity for them to, interact with Islamic scholars.

The desire of NASFAT to establish a university was borne out of its education policy and plan enunciated at its strategic retreat in Akodo, Lagos, in 2000. From this beginning, the society started a systematic process which led to the hosting of an academic summit where an 18-person planning committee for the university emerged in January 2004.

Fountain University was granted an operational license as a Private University on May 17, 2007, by the federal government on the recommendations of the National Universities Commission. Following this achievement, a Fountain University strategic implementation committee was set up to serve as "in loco council" to actualize the birth of the university. This committee worked tirelessly to put in place the facilities for the university to take-off. The committee was dissolved in September 2007 upon the inauguration of the Governing Council led by Professor N.O. Adedipe. The first Governing Council completed its first four years in September 2011 after which it was reconstituted.

== Administration ==
The current principal members of the university management are:

Office	Holder
Chancellor	Alh. Umaru Mutallab CON
Pro-Chancellor & Chairman Governing Council	Dr. AWA Ibraheem FCA
Chairman Board of Trustee	Mallam Yusuf Olaolu Ali, SAN
Vice-Chancellor	Professor Olayinka Ramota Karim
Deputy Vice Chancellor	Prof. Abdullateef Usman
Registrar	Mr. Sheriff A. Adenekan
Bursar	Dr. Segun S. Balogun
University Librarian	Dr. Sirajudeen F. Bakrin

The university is made up of 28 academic departments organized into 5 Colleges, namely, Arts, Natural and Applied Sciences, Basic Medical Health Sciences, Management and Social Sciences, and Law. The University also has a School of Postgraduate Studies where all postgraduate education are coordinated.

Fountain University has 9 halls of residence that provide accommodation for about 90% of the population of students in the regular studies mode. Some of the popular halls in the university include Ishaq Oloyede Hostel, Yusuf Ali Hostel, Jubrila Ayinla Hall, Adegunwa Hostel, Nimbe Adedipe Hostel among others.

The university has sports facilities for staff and students on campus, as well as a guest house to accommodate researchers and guests of the University.

== Colleges ==
- College of Arts and Education (COAED)
- College of Basic Medical and Health Sciences (COBMHES)
- College of Natural and Applied Sciences (CONAS)
- College of Management and Social Sciences (COMAS)
- College of Law (COLAW)
- School of Postgraduate Studies (SPGS)

== Academic centres ==
- Center for Research, Innovation and Technology
- Centre for In-House Training and Development
- Centre for Entrepreneurial Development
- Centre for Professional Studies
- Centre for Linkages and Advancement
- Centre for Community Development.

== Vice-Chancellors ==
The Vice-Chancellor is supported by two deputy vice-chancellors. Former and current persons who have fulfilled the position are:

1. Professor Olayinka Ramota Karim - Mar. 2023 - till date
2. Professor Sanni, Olalekan Amidu - Mar. 2018 to Feb. 2023
3. Professor Abdullateef Usman (Ag) - Dec. 2016 to Feb. 2018
4. Professor Bashir Ademola Raji - Dec. 2012 to Nov. 2016
5. Professor H.O.B Oloyede - Oct. 2007 to Dec. 2012

== Gallery of campus ==
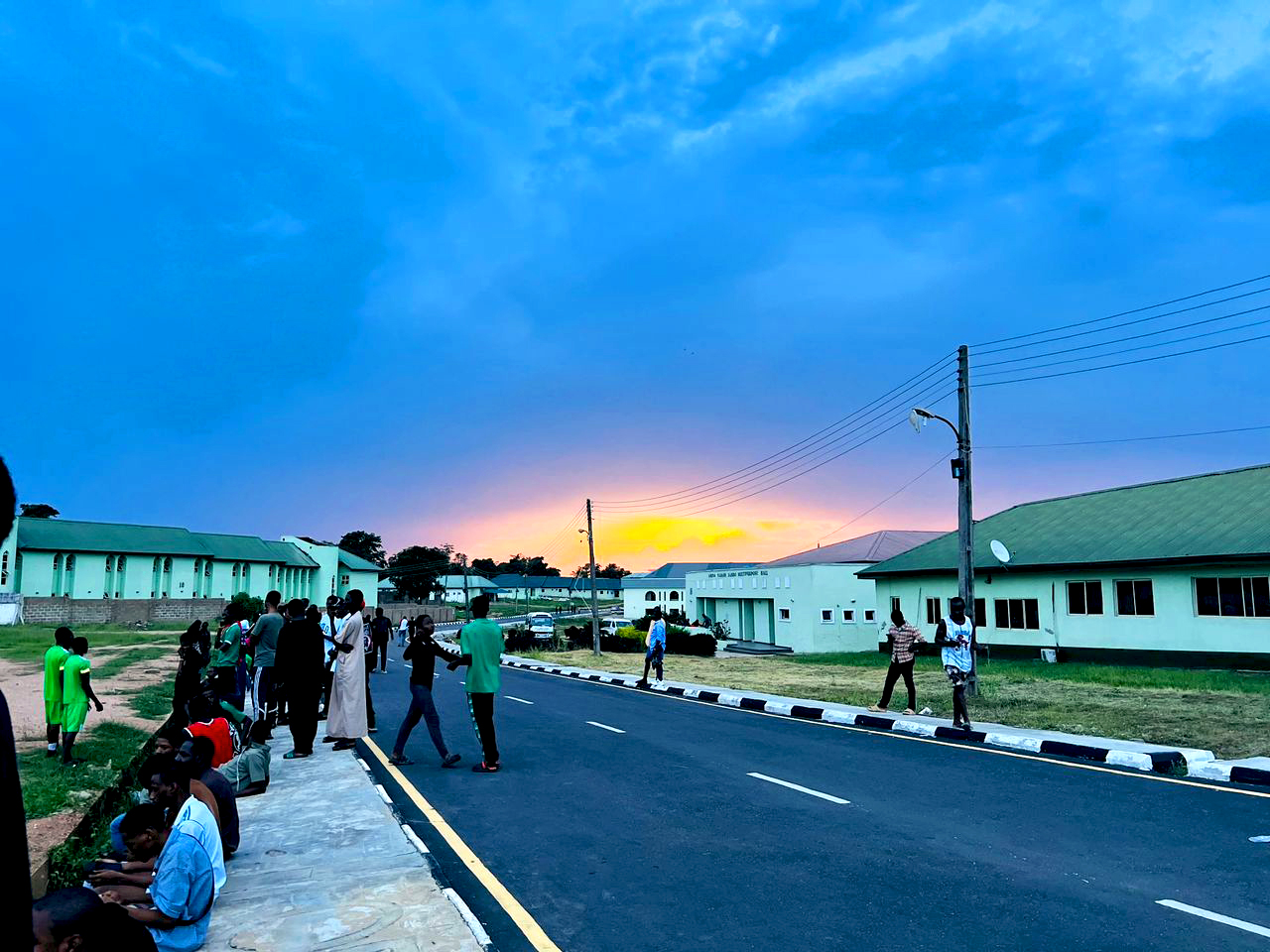
Evening view from Fountain University

Senate Building

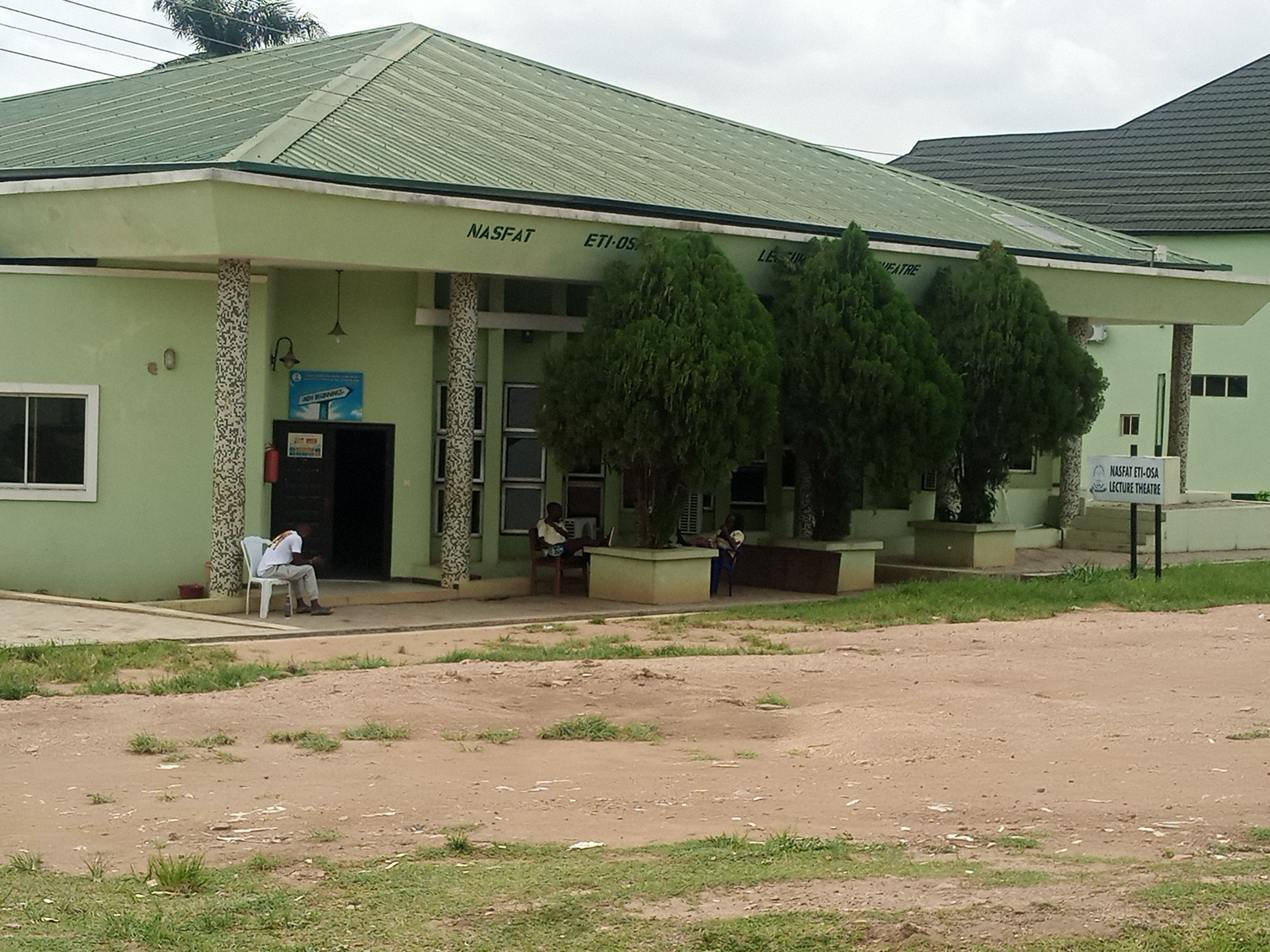
Lecture hall donated by Eti-osa branch of NASFAT

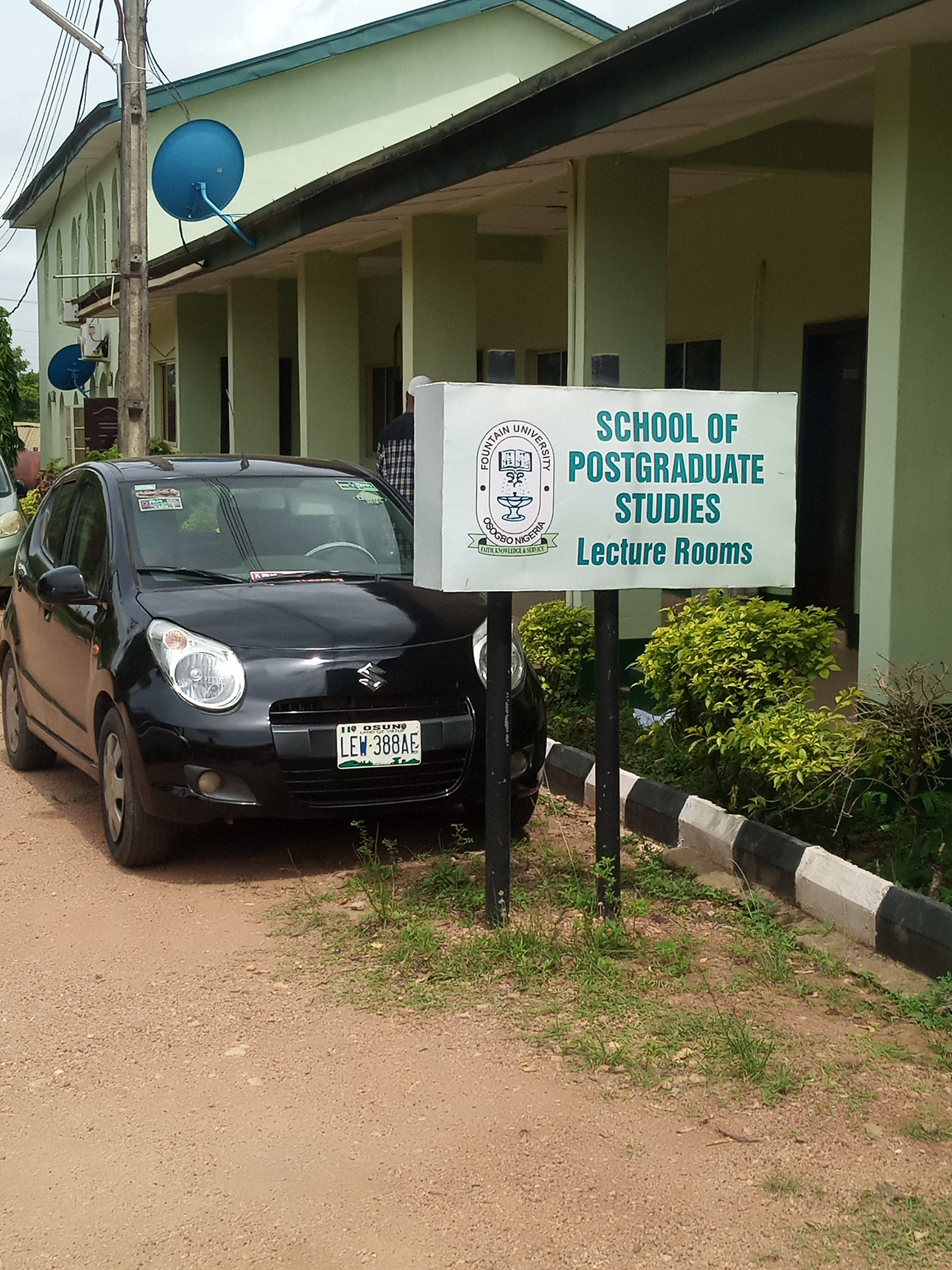
School of Postgraduate Studies

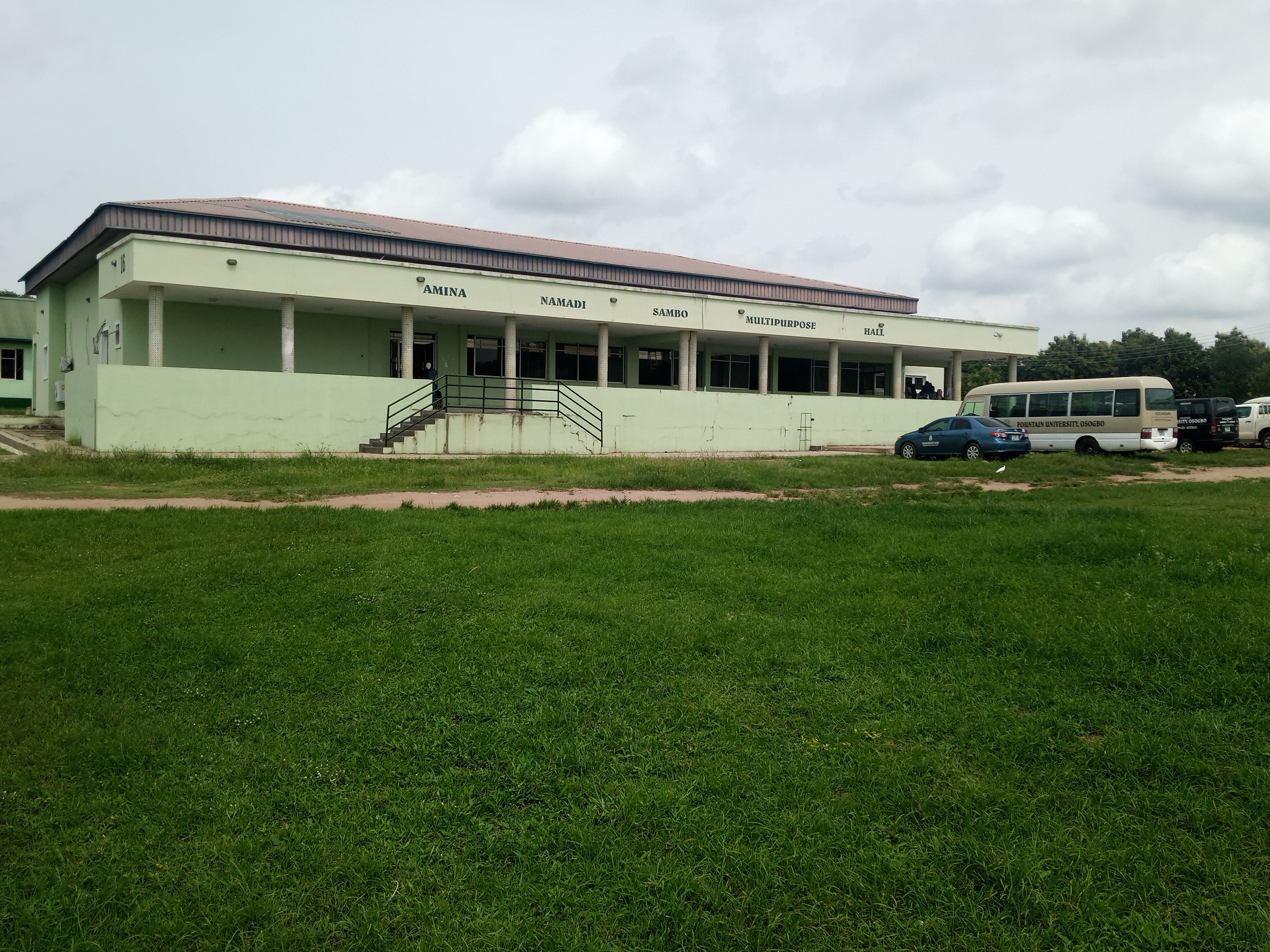
Multipurpose hall

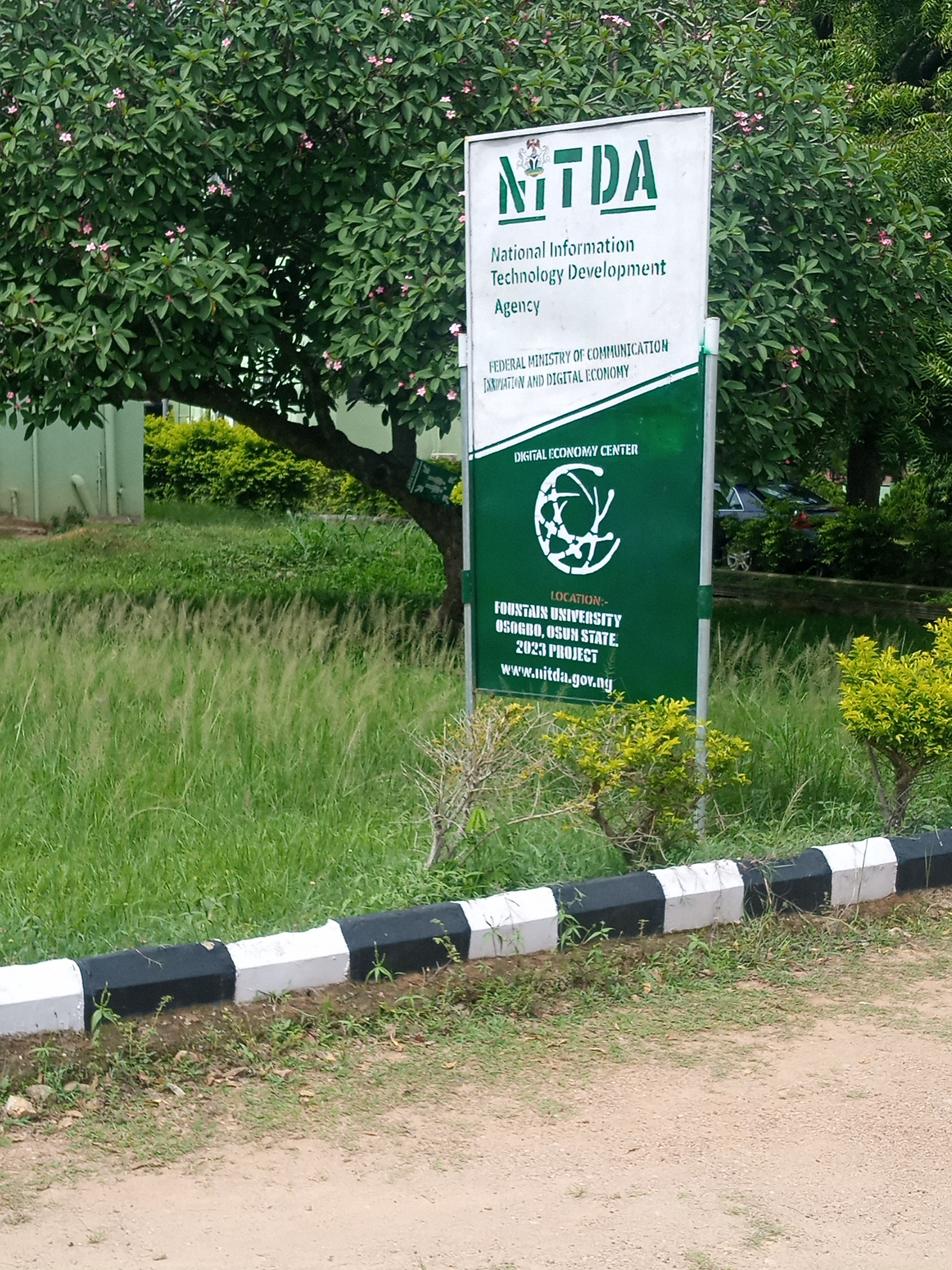
Digital Economy Center
