= Bee Scherer =

German historian of religion

- Born: Burkhard Scherer; 1971
- Occupation: professor of Buddhist studies

Bee Scherer (born Burkhard Scherer, May 21, 1971) is a professor of Buddhist studies at the Vrije Universiteit Amsterdam. Previously, Scherer was professor of gender studies and religious studies at Canterbury Christ Church University. Scherer is the director of INCISE (Intersectional Centre for Inclusion and Social Justice), which facilitates social justice research, and founded Queering Paradigms.

== Career ==
Scherer studied classics (Greek and Latin) and Indian Religions (Hinduism and Buddhism) at the Westphalian Wilhelms University in Münster. They received their doctorate in 2002 from the Dutch University of Groningen with a study on ancient literature and mythology. Relevant publications on Buddhism and world religions followed. From 2003 Scherer has been working at Canterbury Christ Church University in Great Britain as professor of comparative religion and gender and sexuality studies. Main research interests are contemporary Buddhist movements between tradition and modernity. Bee's interest specializes in controversial, charismatic and/or radical forms of Buddhism. Bee has published considerably in the field of Buddhism, Gender and Sexuality.

Scherer is a practicing Buddhist and serves as the vice-chair of the International Lay Buddhist Forum. As Gender Studies scholar, Bee's research has focused on areas of intersectional Social Justice and Critical Theory. As well as the founder of the interdisciplinary Queering Paradigms, Bee is also the editor of QP in Focus book series. Scherer is also co-editor of the academic journal Religion & Gender.

== Selected works ==
- Una Storia del Buddhismo: Introduzione a un insegnamento millenario 2022. Milano: Ubiliber.
- "Queering Buddhist Traditions" 28 Jun 2021, Oxford Research Encyclopedia of Religion. Barton, J. (ed.). Oxford University Press, p. 1-29 29 p.
- "Atypical Bodies: Queer-Feminist and Buddhist Perspectives"2020, Cultural History of Disability in the Modern Age. Mitchell, D. T. & Snyder, S. L. (eds.). London: Bloomsbury Academic, p. 19-28 10 p. (Cultural History of Disability; vol. 6)(Cultural Histories Series).
- "I am a Suicide Waiting to Happen: Reframing Self-Completed Murder and Death" 2019, Suicide and Social Justice: New Perspectives on the Politics of Suicide and Suicide Prevention. Marsh, I. & Button, M. E. (eds.). London: Routledge, p. 141-151
- “Queer Voices, Social Media and Neo-orthodox Dharma: A Case Study” in O’Mara, Kathleen and Morrish, Liz (eds.) Queering Paradigms, Vol. 3: Bio-Politics, Place, and Representations. Oxford: Peter Lang 2013, pp. 145–155.
- “Globalizing Tibetan Buddhism: Modernism and Neo-Orthodoxy in Contemporary Karma bKa’ brgyud Organizations.” Contemporary Buddhism 13 (2012), 125–137.
- “Nāgārjuna on Temporary Happiness and Liberation: Readings of the Ratnāvalī in India, China, and Tibet” in Sharma, Anita (ed.), Buddhism in East Asia. Delhi: Vidyanidhi Publishers 2012, pp. 125–139.
- “Macho Buddhism: Gender and Sexualities in the Diamond Way” Religion and Gender 1, pp. 85–103,
- “Interpreting the Diamond Way: Contemporary Convert Buddhism in Transition.” Journal of Global Buddhism 10, pp. 17–48,
- “Kambala’s Ālokamāla and the Perils of Philology.” Buddhist Studies Review 2006.2, pp. 121–126.
- “Gender transformed and meta-gendered enlightenment: Reading Buddhist narratives as paradigms of inclusiveness.” Revista de Estudos da Religião – REVER 6.3 (2006), pp. 65–76, [REVER - N. 3 - Ano 6 - 2006] Texto - Burkhard Scherer.
