= Nimbe Adedipe Library =

Academic library of the Federal University of Agriculture, Abeokuta

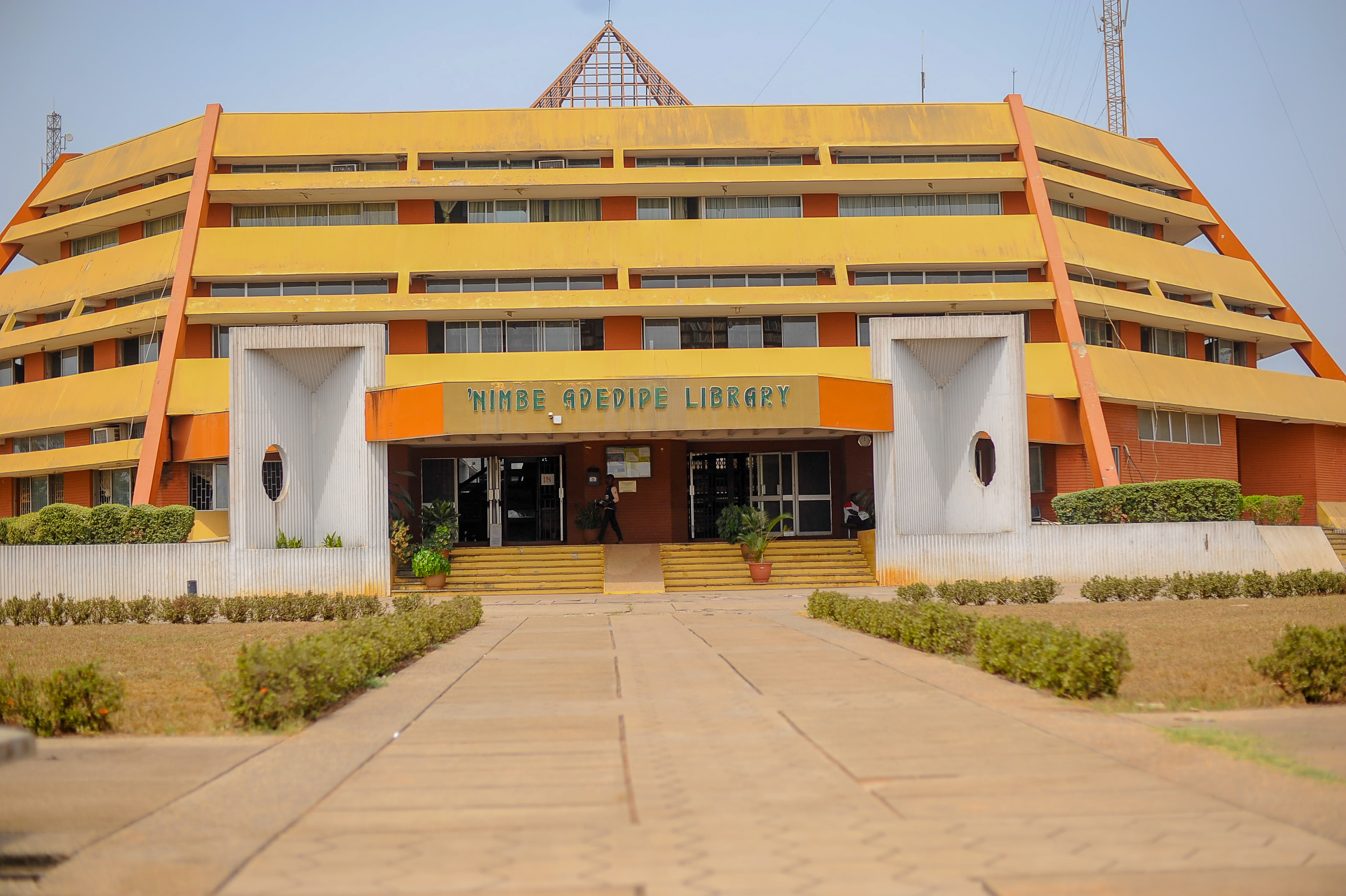
- 7°13′51″N 3°26′12″E
- Location: Nigeria
- Type: Academic Library
- Established: 1988

Other information
- Director: Dr. Fehintola Nike Onifade
- Website: unaab.edu.ng

Nimbe Adedipe Library is located on the campus of Federal University of Agriculture, Abeokuta in Ogun State, Nigeria. It was established in 1988.

== Historical Background ==
On 1 January 1988, the Federal Government of Nigeria established three university of agriculture. The University of Lagos Abeokuta campus(ULAB) which was at mini-campus at Isale igbein was changed to full-fledged university and the name was changed to University of Agriculture Abeokuta (UNAAB). The library now became UNAAB Library from ULAB library. This university of agriculture later moved to its permanent site at Alabata along Ibadan road where an ultra modern library was built. The Library was later named 'Nimbe Adedipe Library to honour the first Vice-Chancellor of the university, Professor Nurudeen Olorunnimbe Adedipe. The ultra modern building can accommodate 1000 users at a time. The total collection of books at present is over 91,800 titles while the total collection of journals on the shelves at present is 3,723 titles.

== Sections and Services ==
'Nimjbe Adedipe Library operates the following sections and services

1. Selective Dissemination Services
2. Reference Services
3. Reserved Book Service
4. Inter-library Loan Service
5. Current Awareness Service
6. Bibliography Services
7. User education and information literacy training
8. Borrowing Services
9. 24-hours reading room service which can accommodate 100 users at a time

== Automation of the Library ==
The automation of the library started in 1994 when the library acquired an IBM personal computer and the TINLIB (The Information navigation Library) library software designed for four work stations through a World Bank Project. This was later upgraded to ten work stations. From the DOS based TINLIB software, the library moved to a more versatile window based GLAS (Graphical Library Automation System) software with capacity to operate 50 work stations within the library. There are terminals in all sections which are connected to the main server. The library during the 2012/2013session acquired KOHA, an Integrated Library Management software that enables users to access the library resources and services anywhere. At present, the library Oline Open Access Cataloque (OPAC) is fully functional making it possible to access bibliographical details of library holdings/resources online.

== CD-ROM Databases ==
In order to improve literature search and document delivery capacity in the library, the university acquired two CD-ROM databases in 1998. The CD-ROM databases are

1. CAB Abstracts on CD-ROM, 1992-2000
2. TEEAL (The Essential Electronic Agricultural Library) CD-ROM, 1993-1996

== Electronic Databases and E-library ==
The library has access to the followings electronic databases

1. TEEAL (The Essential Electronic Agricultural Library)
2. AGORA (Access to Global On-line Research in Agriculture)
3. HINARI (Health International Network Access to Research Initiatives)
4. Nigerian University Libraries Consortium (NULIC) which provides access to EBSCO Host full text journals in virtually all subjects.
