= Olusola Kehinde =

Nigerian academic

7th Vice-Chancellor of Federal University of Agriculture, Abeokuta
- Incumbent
- Assumed office 9 March 2023
- Preceded by: Felix Salako

Personal details
- Born: Olusola Babatunde Kehinde
- Education: University of Ibadan
- Profession: Academic; Educator; Administrator

Olusola Kehinde is a Nigerian professor of plant breeding and genetics who became the Vice Chancellor of the Federal University of Agriculture, Abeokuta, Ogun state, Nigeria since 2023. He was the Deputy Vice-Chancellor (Development) until his appointment as the Vice-Chancellor.
