= Seyi Adebanjo =

Nigerian filmmaker

Seyi Adebanjo is a genderfluid, queer MFA media artist, born in Nigeria and now resident in New York City. Adebanjo's work aims to generate social awareness about issues of race, gender, and sexuality through the use of multimedia photography, film, digital video, and writings.

== Exhibited and published work ==
Their work has been published by African Voices magazine, Osun State University, Q-Zine, and the Mott Haven Herald. Adebanjo has presented at New York University, and Lambda Literary Foundation, the University Film and Video Association Conference, and the Brazilian Queering Paradigms Conference.

== Films ==
Trans Lives Matter!: Justice for Islan Nettles is a seven-minute film that focuses on the murder of a transgender woman named Islan Nettles in August 2013. The film was screened by PBS Channel 13, as well as the Brooklyn Museum.

Oya! Something Happened on the Way to West Africa! is a short, 30-minute documentary that explores sexual and racial identity. The film examines the experiences of and disparities between queer and genderfluid Africans in Nigeria and New York. The element of spirituality in relation to these topics is also discussed. The documentary is currently screening internationally.
