= Killing of Islan Nettles =

African American transgender woman murdered on 2013

- Location: Harlem, New York City, U.S.
- Date: August 17, 2013; 13 years ago
- Attack type: Homicide
- Victim: Islan Nettles
- Perpetrator: James Dixon
- Motive: Transphobia
- Charges: First-degree manslaughter

Islan Rose Nettles (d. August 22, 2013) was an African American transgender woman who was attacked on August 17, 2013, and died from her injuries on August 22, 2013.

== Life ==
Islan Nettles was a 21-year-old woman living in Harlem, New York. She was born the second-oldest out of seven children. After graduating from Bread and Roses Integrated Arts High School in 2009, she took courses at the New York City College of Technology in hopes of becoming a professional fashion designer. She worked as an intern assistant fashion designer at Ay'Medici, and an assistant photographer and fashion instructor at Harlem Children's Zone.

== Killing ==
Nettles was attacked in Harlem just after midnight on August 17, 2013. She was walking with two friends when the three of them came across a group of men at Frederick Douglass Boulevard and 148th Street, across the street from a police station. She was brought to Harlem Hospital, where doctors had to remove a portion of her skull and brain. Nettles was declared brain-dead August 20 2013, but the doctors delayed taking her off life support until August 22 at the request of Nettles' mother Delores.

== Vigil and funeral ==
A vigil was held for Nettles at Jackie Robinson Park on August 27, 2013. Shouts erupted from the crowd at several points during the vigil due to frustration from transgender audience members over the lack of transgender speakers, and several speakers' tendency to misgender Nettles.

Nettles's funeral was held at St. John Pentecostal Church on Lenox Avenue and 132nd Street. A veil was put over her face to cover up her injuries.

== Court case ==
The killer, James Dixon, was not indicted until March 2015, despite turning himself in three days after the attack. During his confession, Dixon said that he had flown into "a blind fury" when he realized that Nettles was a transgender woman. He also said his friends mocked him for flirting with Nettles—not realizing that she was transgender—and that he felt the need to attack her because "[his] pride was at stake." Furthermore, in an incident a few days prior to the beating, his friends had teased him after he flirted with two transgender women while he was doing pull-ups on a scaffolding at 138th Street and Eighth Avenue.

Dixon pleaded not guilty to first-degree manslaughter at his indictment, despite the police having several recorded confessions from him. His attorney, Norman Williams, tried to prevent the confessions from being used for the trial based on technicalities, but the evidence was ruled admissible. Afterwards, Dixon changed his mind about exercising his right to trial, and pleaded guilty. Dixon was not charged with murder, which would have required proof of intent, nor was he charged with a hate crime. He received a 17 year sentence, which judge Robert Stolz lowered to 12 years. He would have faced up to 25 years in prison if found guilty during a trial. Delores Nettles believed the sentence was too lenient, and sought to push for federal hate crime charges.

Dixon was incarcerated at Clinton Correctional Facility.

== Reaction ==
Trans Lives Matter!: Justice for Islan Nettles is a seven-minute film that focuses on Nettles' killing. The film was directed by Oluseyi Adebanjo and screened by PBS Channel 13, as well as the Brooklyn Museum. Other screenings where the film has been featured include Official Selection at the 28th BFI Flare London, LGBT Film Festival, Gender Reel Film Festival, Al Jazeera America, and Black Star Film Festival.

On January 30, 2014, over 100 protestors gathered outside the 1 Police Plaza, New York City Police Department headquarters. Amongst the protestors was Delores Nettles. There were also local LGBTQ+ rights organizers such as Daniella Carter, Lourdes Ashley Hunter, and Madison St. Sinclair.

== See also ==
- Gay and trans panic defense
