= Saundra Herndon Oyewole =

American microbiologist (1943–2025)

- Born: April 26, 1943; Washington, D.C., U.S.
- Died: September 26, 2025 (aged 82)
- Education: Howard University; University of Massachusetts
- Occupation: Microbiologist
- Employer: Trinity Washington University

Saundra Herndon Oyewole (April 26, 1943 – September 26, 2025) was an American microbiologist.

== Background ==
Oyewole attended Howard University, which she graduated in 1965 magna cum laude. She moved to the University of Chicago for her Master's studies, which she completed in 1967, before joining the University of Massachusetts for her PhD. Her husband, Godwin Oyewole, graduated with a doctorate in education on the same day she graduated with a doctorate in microbiology. She was a member of the Phi Beta Kappa society.

Oyewole died on September 26, 2025, at the age of 82.

== Research and career ==
Oyewole's research considered the structure of photosynthetic membranes. Oyewole was appointed Assistant Professor of microbiology at Hampshire College in 1981. She was appointed Professor of Biology in 1988 at Trinity Washington University and became Clare Booth Luce Professor in 1990. In 1994 she was Program Director of Undergraduate Education at the National Science Foundation. In 1998 she was appointed Dean of the Faculty.

She had been on the board of directors at the National Association of Advisors for the Health Professions since 1993. She was made president elect in 1996 and appointed President in 1998. Oyewole has been part of the Association of American Medical Colleges Advisory Group that evaluated the new Medical College Admission Test. She became Dean of the College of Arts and Sciences in 2002.

Oyewole was committed to increasing diversity within health professionals so that it reflects the demographics of the United States. She had testified before the United States Congress on the status of women in science.
