= Port Harcourt Electricity Distribution Company =

Nigerian private electric distributor

- Company type: Private
- Industry: Utility
- Headquarters: 1 Moscow Road, Old GRA, Port Harcourt, Nigeria
- Area served: Rivers, Bayelsa, Cross River and Akwa Ibom
- Key people: MD/CEO: Ete Pinnick; Chairman: Engr. Olice Kemenanabo
- Services: Electricity distribution
- Number of employees: 4,000+
- Website: www.phed.com.ng

The Port Harcourt Electricity Distribution Company (PHED) is a private electric distributor that provides power for a total of 14 million people in 4 states of Nigeria including Rivers, Bayelsa, Cross River and Akwa Ibom. It first operated as a government-owned enterprise before being privatized in 2013. Presently, PHED is owned by 4 Power Consortium Ltd. The headquarters are located at 1 Moscow Road in Old GRA, Rivers State.

On September 1, 2020, PHED announced a new electricity tariff for customers in Akwa Ibom, Bayelsa, Cross River and Rivers states.

== Leadership ==
The current MD/CEO of PHED is Mr. Ete Pinnick. The Board Chairman is Engr. Olice Kemenanabo.
