= Ayoka Olufunmilayo Adebambo =

Nigerian scientist

- Born: Lagos, Nigeria
- Education: University of Ibadan
- Occupation: Academic
- Employer(s): Federal University of Agriculture Abeokuta, Nigeria
- Known for: First female Professor of Animal Breeding and Genetics in Nigeria
- Spouse: Adebambo

Ayoka Olufunmilayo Adebambo is a Nigerian scientist and professor of Animal Breeding and Genetics. She is the first female professor and first Head of the Department of Animal Breeding and Genetics in Nigeria. In September 2010, she was awarded the status of a Fellow of the Animal Science Association of Nigeria (ASAN).

She has a BSc in animal science and a PhD in Animal Breeding from the University of Ibadan.

== Career ==
She started her career at the University of Ibadan as a demonstrator before moving to the Institute of Agricultural Research and Training of the Obafemi Awolowo University, Ile-Ife. While at Ile-Ife, she focused on improving pig breeds for the purpose of commercialization. In 1993, she moved to the Department of Animal Breeding and Genetics, Federal University of Agriculture, Abeokuta, Nigeria. She is currently a member of the university's Governing Council. She has served as a visiting scholar at the Roslin Institute in Scotland; the Poultry Breeding Institute in Hesaraghatta, India and Ohio State University in the United States.

== Awards and recognition ==
In 2010, she received the award of Fellow of the Animal Science Association of Nigeria (ASAN) alongside other scientists. She was listed in Silverbird TV's 16 prominent Nigerian women in Science and Research. Ayoka also received the British Council Award and the Commonwealth Fellowship. She has also received a World Bank Research Award, the National Universities Commission Outstanding Research Award, and Egba-Lisabi's Service Award as Role Model to Womanhood.

== Publications ==
- Application of principal component and discriminant analyses to morpho-structural indices of indigenous and exotic chickens raised under intensive management system
- Effect of crossbreeding on fertility, hatchability and embryonic mortality of Nigerian local chickens
- Genotype effect on distribution pattern of maternally derived antibody against Newcastle disease in Nigerian local chickens
- Effect of Chicken Genotype on Growth Performance of Pure and Crossbred Progenies in the Development of a Broiler Line
- Genetic Diversity of zyxin and TNFRSF1A genes in Nigerian Local Chickens and Nera Black Chickens
