= Olusola Teniola =

Nigerian businessman (born 1966)

- Born: 1966 July, 10th
- Education: HND in Electrical & Electronic Engineering; B.Eng with honors in Computer and Information Engineering
- Occupation: Engineer
- Employer: Freelance
- Title: Chief Executive Officer

Olusola Teniola (born 10 July 1966) in London, is a technology enthusiast based in Lagos, Nigeria. Olusola Teniola is now engaged in various new projects in West Africa. He has been Nigeria National Coordinator for the Alliance for Affordable Internet (A4AI.org) since Nov 2019. He is the Immediate Past President of the Association of Telecommunications Companies of Nigeria (ATCON). Previously he was a Client Partner with Detecon International, a subsidiary of Deutsche Telekom, Germany; responsible for Nigeria and ready West Africa. He was also CEO/MD and a board member of IS Internet Solutions (a Dimension Data company) in Lagos, Nigeria, from March 2013 to June 2016. In between Jan 2010 to Mar 2013, he was the COO and Director of Engineering at Phase3 Telecom, Abuja.

Olusola is now involved in various new projects. He was briefly Chief Executive Officer (CEO) of Phase3 Telecom.

He served in executive management positions at British Telecom, Alcatel-Lucent Technologies and Vodafone.

Olusola obtained an HND in Electrical & Electronic Engineering and a B.Eng with honors in Computer and Information Engineering from London South Bank University. He also holds an MBA from the University of Bath School of Management awarded in 2003. He is also a member of the Institute of Directors (MIoD) London and Nigeria
