= Atinuke Olusola Adebanji =

Nigerian-Ghanaian statistician

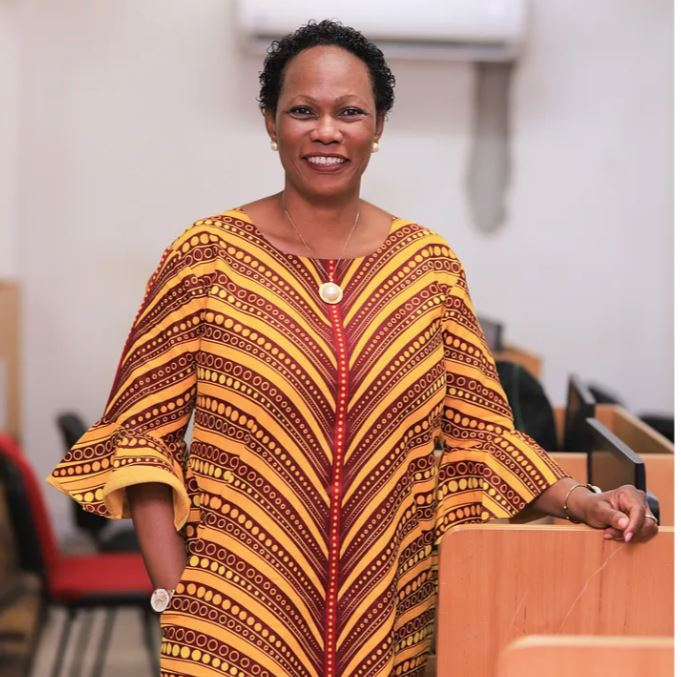

Academic background
- Education: University of Ilorin (B.Sc. ) University of Ibadan (M.Sc. & PhD) Kwame Nkrumah University of Science and Technology (MPH)
- Alma mater: University of Ilorin, University of Ibadan & Kwame Nkrumah University of Science and Technology

Academic work
- Discipline: Statistics
- Institutions: Kwame Nkrumah University of Science and Technology
- Website: https://tinuadebanji.com/

Atinuke Olusola Adebanji is a Nigerian academic. She is the first female professor of statistics in Ghana and the founding head of the Department of Statistics and Actuarial Science at the Kwame Nkrumah University of Science and Technology in Ghana.

== Early life and education ==
Atinuke Olusola Adebanji is the third child out of nine children in her family. She grew up in GRA, Ilorin, Kwara State, Nigeria. She earned her Ph.D. in statistics from the University of Ibadan in 2006, and joined the Kwame Nkrumah University of Science and Technology as a senior lecturer, after which she was promoted to the rank of full professor in 2018 at the Kwame Nkrumah University of Science and Technology (KNUST). Her academic journey began with a bachelor's degree in statistics obtained from the University of Ilorin in 1990. She then proceeded to the University of Ibadan, where she completed a Master of Science in statistics in 2001. Additionally, Adebanji holds a Master of Public Health in Population, Family, and Reproductive Health from KNUST, which she acquired in 2016.

== Career ==
Atinuke's career began as a statistician II at the External Trade Unit of the Federal Office of Statistics, Lagos and later joined UAC Nig PLC as a trainee accountant from 1992 to 1994. She then transitioned into academia, serving as an assistant lecturer in the Department of Mathematics at the University of Agriculture, Abeokuta, Nigeria, from 2003 to 2005, before becoming a lecturer II from 2005 to 2007, and later lecturer I in the Department of Statistics at the same university from 2007 to 2009. Subsequently, she joined the Kwame Nkrumah University of Science and Technology (KNUST) in Ghana, where she held the position of Senior Lecturer in the Department of Mathematics from 2009 to 2013. Since 2018, she has been a Professor in the Department of Mathematics at KNUST after being Associate Professor for ten years. Additionally, Adebanji served as a Senior Research Fellow at the Institute of Mathematical Sciences (ICMAT) in Spain from February to August 2017.

She is an advocate for females in STEM and also a founding and focal member of Women in Science, Technology, Engineering and Mathematics, Ghana (WiSTEMGh). Atinuke Adebanji is the founder and Coordinator of the KNUST Laboratory for Interdisciplinary Analysis (KNUST-LISA)

== Research interest ==
Atinuke's areas of research interest and expertise lie in multivariate data analysis, categorical data analysis, and development statistics.

== Personal life ==
Atinuke currently lives in Kumasi, Ghana and has a daughter and two sons.
