= Queering Paradigms =

Informal network

Queering Paradigms (QP) refers to an informal network, a series of conferences and a book series founded by Professor Bee Scherer. QP originally started as a colloquium in February 2008 to celebrate LGBT History Month at Canterbury Christ Church University. This colloquium was in part a protest against the university's stance to prevent civil partnership ceremonies from taking place on campus. The conferences have since taken place in Canterbury (UK), Brisbane (Australia), Oneonta (US), Rio de Janeiro (Brazil), Quito (Ecuador) and, again in the South of England (Winchester and Canterbury), the Cayman Islands, Vienna (Austria) and Sydney (Australia). The book series has nine volumes so far and three volumes in a sub-series called QP in Focus.

== Queering Paradigms I (February 2009) ==
Flyer for QP 1 in Canterbury

The first official Queering Paradigms conference was organised in February 2009 in Canterbury by B. Scherer, a professor of comparative religion, gender and sexuality at Canterbury Christ Church University. The book resulting from this conference was published by Peter Lang Oxford in 2010 and was edited by Scherer.

== Queering Paradigms II (April 2010) ==
This conference took place at the Queensland University of Technology and was organised by Sharon Hayes, Matthew Ball and Angela Dwyer. Former High Court Justice Michael Kirby gave a keynote speech, which was widely commented upon in Australian newspapers. Subsequently, also second book was published by Peter Lang, edited by B. Scherer and M. Ball.

== Queering Paradigms III (April 2011) ==
QP 3 was organised at SUNY, Oneonta, by professors Kathleen O'Mara and Betty Wambui. K. O'Mara and Liz Morrish edited the corresponding book.

== Queering Paradigms IV (July 2012) ==
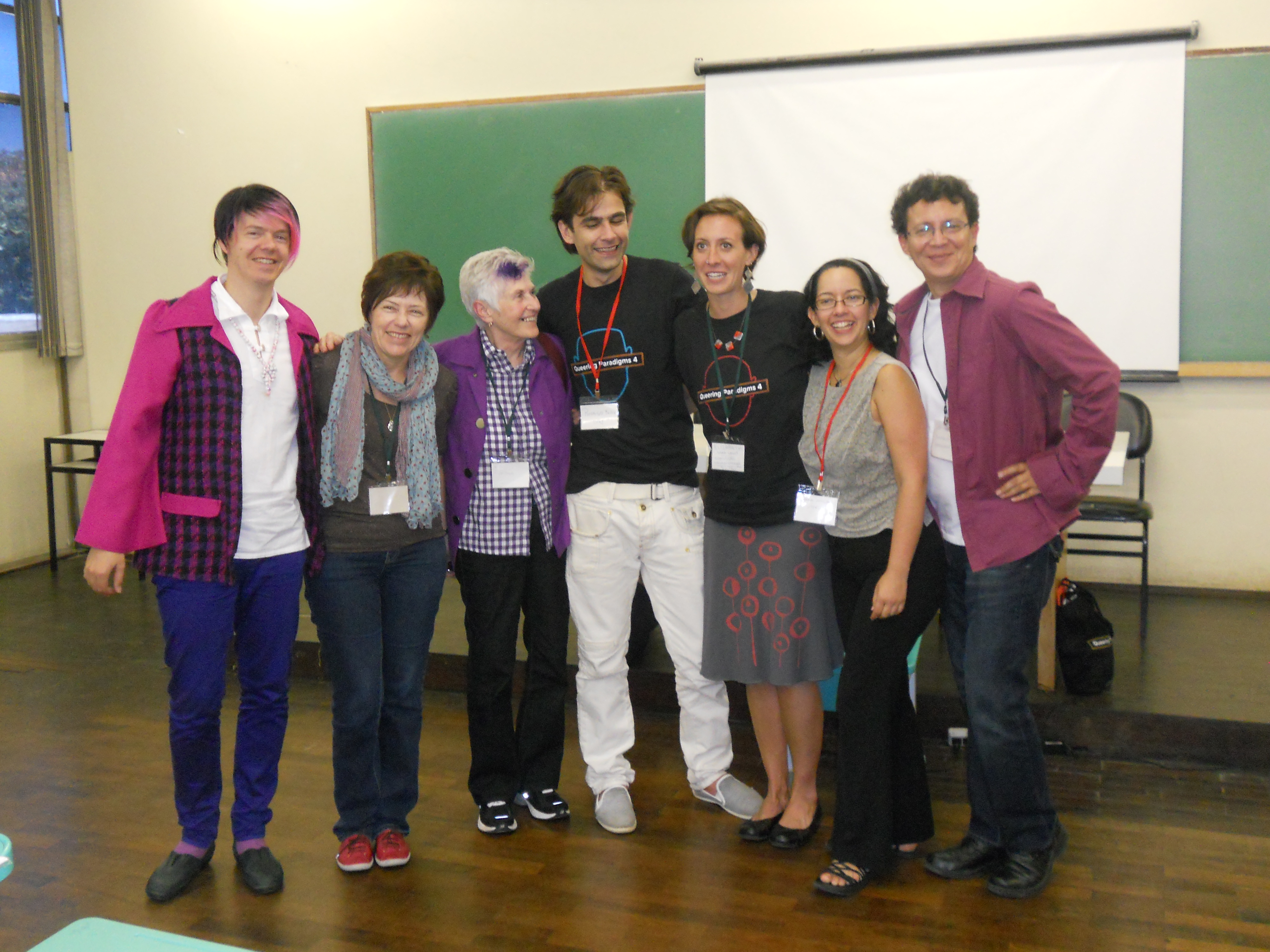
QP organisers

QP 4 took place in Rio de Janeiro and was organised by Rodrigo Borba, Elizabeth Lewis, Branca Fabrício and Diana Pinto, who are also the editors of the QP 4 and QP4a books: QP4 in English was published in 2014 and another volume, QP4a, has been published in 2017 as a bilingual book in Portuguese and Spanish (Insurgências queer ao sul do Equador).

== Queering Paradigms V (February 2014) ==
QP 5 took place in Quito, Ecuador in February 2014. Previously, a regional QP colloquium was organised in Quito in October 2012. QP 5 organisers continued to create social impact after the event, e.g. by lobbying for Equal Marriage in Ecuador. The corresponding QP 5 volume, a hybrid and trilingual book in English, Spanglish, Spanish and Portuguese, was edited Maria Viteri and Manuela Picq (2016).

== Queering Paradigms VI (July 2015) ==
Organised by QP founder Bee Scherer, QP 6 took place in the south of England in July 2015 and focused on the intersection of disability studies and queer studies. Held both at the University of Winchester and Canterbury Christ Church University, QP 6 part-merged with the VariAbilities II conference. In a final event an Emerging Scholars' day was held at the University of Kent organised by the Centre for Gender, Sexuality and Writing. The corresponding QP6 book was edited by Bee Scherer and was published in 2016 by Peter Lang Oxford; the VariAbilities II companion volume, The Variable Body in History, was edited by Chris Mounsey and Stan Booth (2016) as the inaugural volume of the QP in Focus sub-series.

== Queering Paradigms VII (June 2016) ==
QP 7 organisers and keynoters

QP 7 took place on the Cayman Islands and was organised by local LGBTIQ+ activists under the sponsorship of Canterbury Christ Church University, UK. Key speakers were the Rt. Rev. Dr. Alan Wilson, Bishop of Buckingham and Professor Emeritus Eugenio Raúl Zaffaroni, justice of the Inter-American Court of Human Rights. Because the conference attracted some opposition from local politicians there was a police presence; there were however no reported disturbances.

The QP7 volume was edited by Professor Bee Scherer with Dr Patrick de Vries and was published in 2018.

== Queering Paradigms VIII (September 2017) ==
QP 8 was organised by a collective of activists and academics (M. Katharina Wiedlack, Masha Neufeld, Masha Godovananya, Tania Zabolotnaya and others) in Vienna from 20 September until 23 September 2017 at the University of Vienna. The QP 8 volume was edited by Katharina Wiedlack, Saltanat Shoshanova and Masha Godovananya (2020).

== Queering Paradigms IX (July 2018) ==
Organised by Nicole L Asquith (Western Sydney University), Matthew Ball (Queensland University of Technology), Trudie Broderick (Black Rainbow), Angela Dwyer (University of Tasmania), Justin Ellis (University of Sydney), QP9 took place in Sydney from 11 July to 13 July at the University of Sydney.

Key Speakers were Dameyon Bonson (Black Rainbow, Australia), Professor Jo Phoenix (Open University, UK) and Dr Jace Valcore (University of Houston Downtown, USA).

== Queering Paradigms @ CIRQUE (June 2019) ==
In 2019 Queering Paradigms was part of the second Interuniversity Centre for Queer Research (CIRQUE - Centro interuniversitario di ricerca queer) conference at the University of Pisa. The QP sessions were organised by Professor Bee Scherer, Professor Ulrike Auga, Elisaveta Dvorakk, Dr Patrick de Vries, and Dan Thorpe.

== Queering Paradigms in 2020 and 2021 ==
Originally, a small QP colloquium was planned for May 2020 in Kyoto, Japan, but due to the COVID-19 pandemic this had to be cancelled. An online/hybrid conference instead was organised for June 2021 in conjunction with the Transgressive Religions Network (Paris) with Keynotes by Professor Melissa Wilcox and Professor Naomi Goldenberg.

== QP in Focus ==
The following books have been published in the QP in Focus series:

The Variable Body in History, edited by Chris Mounsy and Stan Booth

Sculpting the Woman by Jamilla Rosdahl

Revoke Ideology by Alipio DeSousa Filho
