= Yusuf Olaolu Ali =

Nigerian lawyer

Professor Yusuf Olaolu Ali (born September 7, 1956), SAN is a Nigerian lawyer or law advocate, called to the Nigerian Bar in 1983. He is a Senior Advocate of Nigeria. He is the first Kuliyan Ngeri of the Ilorin Emirate (the number one legal advice of the Emirate), a title conferred upon him by the Emir of Ilorin, Ibrahim Kolapo Sulu-Gambari for his remarkable contribution to the growth and development of the Ilorin emirate.

== Early life and education ==
Yusuf Ali was born to Alhaji Bisiriyu Olayiwola Ali, of Ilare quarters Ifetedo, in Ife South Local Council of Osun state.

== Career ==
He has served as the chairman and Editor-in-Chief of the Nigerian Bar Journal. He has authored many books including "Anatomy of Corruption In Nigeria: Issues, Challenges, And Solutions" and "Two Decades Of Forensic Advocacy At The Inner Bar in Printprint".

He is not only a legal icon but also a philanthropist, making contributions to humanity through the vehicle of the Yusuf Ali Foundation.

== Achievements ==
Mallam Yusuf Olaolu Ali, is one of the most decorated Nigerian lawyers in history. A few of the awards conferred on him are:

- Lifetime Achievement Award by the Governing Board of Editors of the American Biographical Institute
- West Africa International Golden Award for Excellence in Enterprise
- Award of Excellence presented by AIESEC ILORIN
- Award of Excellence as a Doyen of Legal Luminary in Nigeria by Nigerian Vogue
- Special Award by FIDA KWARA
- Award of Excellence by the National Association of Muslim Law Students, National Headquarters, Abuja.
- Distinguished Personality Award presented by the Faculty of Law, University of Ibadan
- Merit Award by the Nigerian Institute of Management, Kwara State Branch
- Award of Excellence by the National Association of Polytechnic Students
- Award of Excellence by the Students’ Union of the University of Ilorin
- Award of Exemplary Leadership and Service by Rotary Club, Ilorin
- Merit Award by the Ibadan Boys High School Old Boys Association
- Merit Award by All Nigeria Confederation of Principals of Secondary Schools, Osun State Branch
- Kwame Nkrumah Leadership Award of 2010 Africa Legal Icon by All Africa Students’ Union
- Award by the NBA Women's Forum for Immense Contribution and Activities to the Forum
- Police Friendly Award 2009 by the KWARA State Police Command
- Kwame Nkrumah Leadership Award on Education Per Excellence/Icon of Societal Development by the West African Students’ Union
- Commander of Great IFE, (COI) by the OBAFEMI Awolowo Universityuniversity national Alumni.
- Honorary Degree of Doctor Of Letters (Honoris Causa) of Al HIKMA University

== Membership ==
Yusuf Ali SAN is a member of professional bodies such as:

- Nigerian Bar Association
- International Bar Association
- American Bar Association
- Commonwealth Lawyers Association
- Nigerian Body of Benchers
