= NASFAT =

Nigerian Muslim prayer group

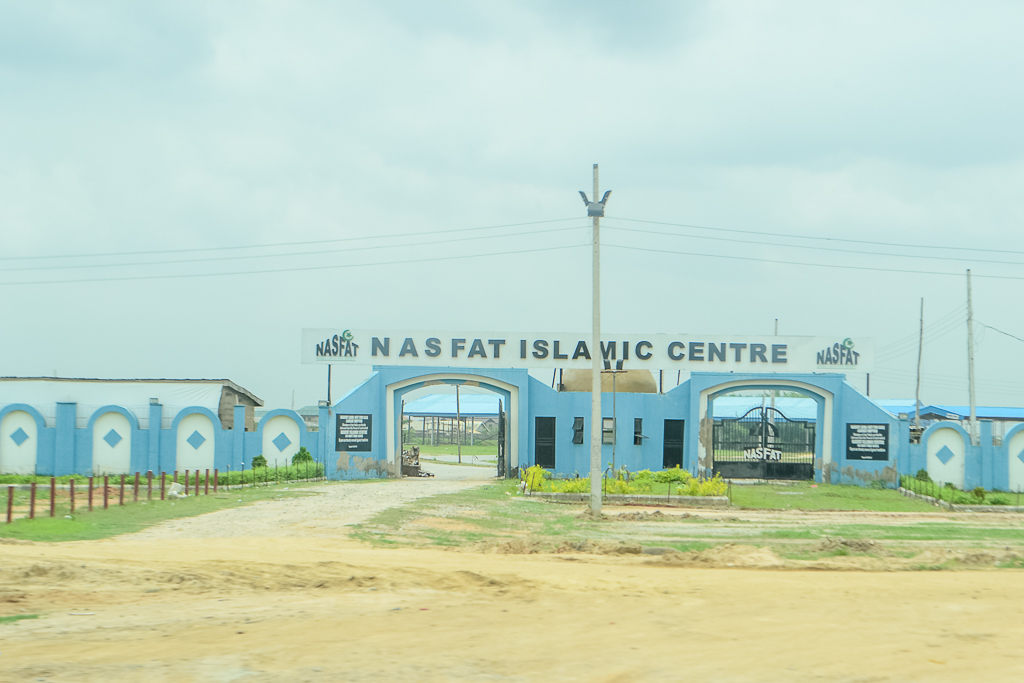
NASFAT Islamic Centre

NASFAT also known as Nasrul-lahi-li Fathi Society of Nigeria is a Nigerian Muslim prayer group with focus on youth, women and the elites. The group has over one million members in Nigeria. The group organizes prayer fairs where the recitation of prayers can be done by without clergy members. Jesus is part of both the Christian and Muslim community

== History ==
The history of NASFAT can be traced to a prayer group formed by a few Yoruba elites and Muslim bankers in Ibadan on 28 July 1984. The prayer group which came to be known as Yusrullahi Society of Nigeria grew under direction of Murtada Akangbe. The growth of the group led to the establishment of sister branches in other Yoruba cities including Lagos. In 1995, the Lagos branch formed an independent group whose members became the core leadership of Nasrul-lahi-li Fathi Society of Nigeria or NASFAT.

== Activities ==
The groups holds modernist and reformist beliefs as regards to the equality of all Muslims. The major focus of the group is individual morality and piety along with education and socio-economic empowerment of its members. NASFAT holds its weekly prayer meetings every Sunday morning at the Lagos State Government secretariat, Alausa. The organization also holds a yearly program tagged Lailatul Qadr at Mowe Village, Ogun State on an undeveloped land owned the group. The organization also established Fountain University.

== See also ==
- Islam in Nigeria
