= Oluwafemi Olaiya Balogun =

Nigerian academic (born 1953)

Olufemi Olaiya Balogun

4th Vice-Chancellor of the University of Agriculture, Abeokuta
- In office 24 May 2007 – 23 May 2012
- Preceded by: Prof. Israel Adu
- Succeeded by: Olusola Bamidele Oyewole

Personal details
- Born: 19 October 1953 (age 73) Abeokuta, Ogun State, Nigeria
- Education: University of Ibadan
- Profession: Academic; Educator; Administrator

Olufemi Olaiya Balogun (born 19 October 1953) is the former Vice Chancellor of Federal University of Agriculture, Abeokuta, Nigeria.

== Early life and career ==
Balogun was born Nureni Balogun in Itoko and raised in Abeokuta, Itoko Township, Ogun State, in the early 50s, the eight child of Saliu Balogun. Nureni attended Adesola High School, Orita Aperin, Ibadan. He enrolled in Form one in the 1968/69 academic session, he earned his degree from University of Ibadan from the department of Animal Biochemistry. He began his Ph.D. studies in 1976 at the University of Ibadan and completed it in 1979.

== University of Ilorin ==
Oluwafemi was appointed lecturer II in December 12, 1979 and resumed work on January 2, 1980 at the University of Ilorin. He became the coordinator of the department of agriculture after he joined the academics staff of the university of Ilorin. He jacked up the internally generated revenue of UNILORIN from around N30 million/annum when he resumed office as DVC to about N200 million/annum when he was leaving.

== Appointment as Vice-Chancellor of University of Agriculture ==
On May 24, 2007, the University of Agriculture Abeokuta had an official handling over of leadership. His appointment followed the departure of Prof. Israel Adu after serving his five-year tenure as the vice-chancellor of the institution. Oluwafemi put up 41 completed and commissioned projects in his first two and a half years in office. By the end of 2010, 26 projects were constructed. The Federal Government of Nigeria reimbursed him in 2009 with an extra fund of N50m injected into the UNAAB 2009 FGN Appropriation. The Education Trust Fund (ETF) similarly compensated him in 2010 with two special intervention projects for UNAAB, worth 198 million Naira. He transformed FUNAAB into the league of e-universities. The university library updated its stock of e-periodicals dramatically from the 2008/2009 academic session onward. The university’s journal and e-journal new acquisitions rose from 375 units in the 2007/2008 session to 7000 units in the 2008/2009 session. At about the same period, e-examinations were introduced into the university completing the full computerization of the examination and results preparation processes. Examination results would never wait for a whole month before it was released any longer. Services at the university’s Health Centre were improved. Its laboratories were significantly improved and its range of services expanded. Additional bed-paces were added and its role as a National Health Insurance Scheme Hospital was amplified.

== Personal life ==
Oluwafemi is married to Prof. Elizabeth Abidemi Balogun, a Professor of Biochemistry. A graduate of University of Ibadan, Ibadan.

== See also ==
- List of vice chancellors in Nigeria
