= Felix Salako =

Nigeria academic (born 1961)

6th Vice-Chancellor of Federal University of Agriculture, Abeokuta
- In office 1 November 2017 – 1 November 2022
- Preceded by: Ololade Enikuomehin
- Succeeded by: Olusola Kehinde (acting)

Personal details
- Born: Felix Kolawole Salako; 18 April 1961 (age 65)
- Education: University of Nigeria; University of Ibadan
- Profession: Academic; Educator; Administrator

Felix Kolawole Salako (born 18 April 1961) is a Nigerian professor of Soil Physics who served as the Vice Chancellor of the Federal University of Agriculture, Abeokuta, Ogun State, Nigeria, from 2017 to 2022. He is a Fellow of the Soil Science Society of Nigeria (FSSSN), and was a two-term deputy vice chancellor before his elevation as the vice chancellor of the said Federal University of Agriculture, Abeokuta, Ogun State, Nigeria.

== Education ==
Salako attended Apostolic Church Grammar School, Orishigun village, in Lagos starting January 1973. He was the Labour Prefect during the 1976/77 academic session and graduated in 1977 with Division One of the West African School Certificate (WASC). He then proceeded to the University of Nigeria, Nsukka, where he earned a Bachelor of Agriculture (B.Agric) and a Master of Science (MSc) in Soil Sciences in 1983 and 1986 respectively. Salako later got his PhD from the University of Ibadan in 1997.

== Career ==
Salako began his career in 1987 as a Consulting Soil Scientist at TCI Associates, Ibadan. He later proceeded to the International Institute of Tropical Agriculture (IITA), Ibadan in 1989, where he initially managed an IITA/United Nations University project located within Okomu Oil Palm Company, Okomu Forest Reserve, Edo State as a Resident Research Associate. From 1989 to 2000, Salako worked on research projects in IITA, Ibadan.

In 2000, Salako became a Senior Lecturer in the Department of Soil Science and Land Management at the Federal University of Agriculture, Abeokuta (FUNAAB). He was promoted to Professor of Soil Physics in 2006. Throughout his tenure, he has supervised over 50 undergraduate projects and more than 30 postgraduate theses. He has written over 90 publications, including journal articles, book chapters, and technical reports.

Professor Salako was re-appointed as head of the department, between January and March 2008 after a year of sabbatical leave at the University of Venice, Venice, Italy. In March 2008, he was appointed Director of the Agricultural Media Resources and Extension Centre (AMREC), a position he held until March 2011. He became the Pioneer Director of the Community-Based Farming Scheme (COBFAS), from March 2011 to September 2011. He became the Deputy Vice-Chancellor (Development) in September 2011 and served two terms of two years each until December 2015.

Professor Salako was listed in Marquis Who's Who in Science and Engineering, Eighth Edition, 2005–2006 in recognition for his achievements. He has received numerous research-support grants, including those from The World Academy of Sciences (TWAS) and the Training and Research in Italian Laboratories (TRIL) of the Abdus Salam International Centre for Theoretical Physics (ICTP), Italy. He participated actively from 2016 to 2020 in the African Cassava Agronomy Initiative (ACAI) as the southwest coordinator under the auspices of IITA, Ibadan. He is also a member of several Professional Societies and was once an Associate Editor for the Journal of Soil and Water Conservation, Iowa, USA.

Professor Salako focused his research over the years on: (1) Rainfall Erosivity and Soil Conservation, (2) Soil Water Flux and Evapotranspiration, and (3) Soil Water Management using Agronomic Practices and Improved Fallow Systems. He has also been involved in Rural Community Development projects across Nigeria. Some of these activities led to his being honored with chieftain titles in two communities in Ogun state; Ishaga Orile and Iwoye Ketu. He was also very active as a community leader in private residential areas.
