= Olusola Bandele Oyewole =

Nigerian academic (born 1955)

President of the Association of African Universities
- In office 2013–2017

Vice-Chancellor of Federal University of Agriculture, Abeokuta
- In office May 2012 – 23 May 2017
- Preceded by: Oluwafemi Olaiya Balogun
- Succeeded by: Ololade Ade Enikuomehin

Personal details
- Born: 30 September 1955 (age 70) Kaduna State, Nigeria
- Party: Non-Partisan

Olusola Bandele Oyewole (born 30 September 1955) is a Nigerian professor of Food science and technology, educational administrator, and former vice chancellor of Federal University of Agriculture, Abeokuta.

== Education ==
Oyewole attended Odo-Otin Grammar School, Osogbo in Osun State, Nigeria. He obtained a Bachelor of Science (B.sc) degree in 1981 from Obafemi Awolowo University. He later proceeded to the prestigious University of Ibadan, where he obtained a Master of Science (M.sc) degree in 1984 and a Doctorate (P.hD) degree in Food science and technology.

== Life and career ==
He was born in Kaduna State, Nigeria on 30 September 1955 but hails from Abeokuta, in Ogun State, Nigeria. He began his career in 1985 as a lecturer in the department of Food science and technology at University of Agriculture, Abeokuta, where he later became the head of the department. He is one of the Nigerian academicians that has contributed significantly to education in Nigeria. Prior to his appointment as the vice chancellor of Federal University of Agriculture, Abeokuta, he has served at different levels of academic organization. He was the Project Officer of the World Bank project on Quality Assurance for African Higher Education systems at the Association of African Universities for three years ( 2006 – 2009) at the Association of African Universities.

== False allegation ==
On 25 November 2016, he along with the Pro Chancellor, Senator Adeseye Ogunlewe, and the former Bursar, Mr. Moses Ilesanmi, were wrongly arraigned before an Ogun State High Court in Abeokuta over N800 million fraud allegations against them by the EFCC But in May 2018, he along with the others accused were discharged and acquitted by the Ogun state high court for lacking merits. The Judge ruled that the allegations were without any merit.

== See also ==
- List of vice chancellors in Nigeria
