= Federal University of Agriculture, Abeokuta =

Public university in Nigeria

- Motto: Knowledge For Development.
- Type: Public research university
- Established: 1 January 1988
- Academic affiliations: ACU, AAU, NUC
- Vice-Chancellor: Professor Olusola Kehinde
- Academic staff: 529
- Administrative staff: 1,447
- Students: 2,538
- Undergraduates: 15,095
- Postgraduates: 1,640
- Location: Abeokuta, Ogun State, Nigeria; 7.22976°N 3.43929°E
- Campus: Rural
- Colors: Green
- Website: www.funaab.edu.ng

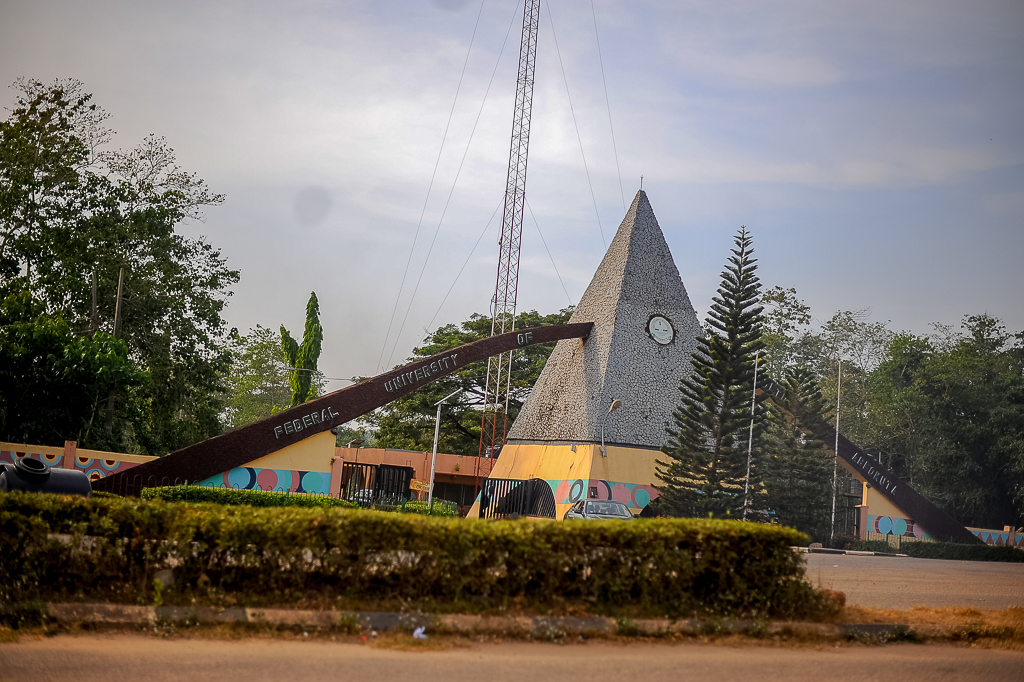
Federal University of Agriculture Abeokuta gate, Abeokuta

The Federal University of Agriculture, Abeokuta, or FUNAAB, is one of the higher institutions of learning owned and run by the Federal government of Nigeria.

== History ==
The Federal University of Agriculture, Abeokuta, Ogun State, was established on 1 January 1988, by the Federal Government when four universities of technology, earlier merged in 1984, were demerged. This led to the creation of the first two universities of agriculture in Abeokuta and Makurdi.

Prior to the emergence of FUNAAB, the Federal Government had established the Federal University of Technology, Abeokuta (FUTAB) in 1983. Then, in 1984, it was merged with the University of Lagos and had its name changed to the College of Science and Technology, Abeokuta (COSTAB), before the demerger of January 1988.

The university started on the old campus of Abeokuta Grammar School, Isale-Igbein, near the city center. It completed its movement to its permanent site along Alabata Road in 1997.

At the initial stage the university included five colleges, as follows:

- College of Agricultural Management, Rural Development and Communication Studies (COLAMRUCS)
- College of Animal Science and Livestock Production (COLANIM)
- College of Environmental Resources Management (COLERM)
- College of Natural Sciences (COLNAS)

The College of Natural Science was reformed and redrafted into three colleges, which are:

- College of Physical Sciences (COLPHYS)
- College of Biological Science (COLBIOS), and
- College of Plant Science and Crop Production (COLPLANT)

Two additional colleges, the College of Engineering (COLENG) and the College of Veterinary Medicine (COLVET), were introduced in March 2002. During the 2008/2009 session, the College of Agricultural Management, Rural Development, and Communication Studies was split into two, with two new colleges emerging as follows:

- College of Food Science and Human Ecology (COLFHEC)
- College of Agricultural Management and Rural Development (COLAMRUD)

The newest College is the College of Management Sciences (COLMAS).

The university is one of the three universities of agriculture in Nigeria, the other being in Makurdi (Benue State) and Umudike (Abia State). The university started at its mini-campus in Isale-Igbein in the heart of Abeokuta, the capital of Ogun State. In December 1997, it moved to its permanent site on a 10,000-hectare (120,000,000 sq yd) campus located next to the Ogun-Oshun River Basin Development Authority on the Abeokuta-Ibadan road in the northeastern end of the city, 15 km from Abeokuta City Centre.

== Governing council ==
The first council was constituted on 18 May 1989, under the chairmanship of Alhaji Muhammadu Jega, former head of service and secretary to the Sokoto State Government. On 1 September 1990, the council was reconstituted with some changes for five years, with Alhaji Muhammadu Jega retained as chairman. The second governing council was constituted in 2000 for five years, with Alhaji Sanni Bagiwa Idris as chairman. The third council came on board in 2005 and was dissolved in November 2007 by the federal government. Elder Brigadier General (Rtd.) Bassey Asuquo, a one-time military administrator of Kogi, Edo, and Delta States, respectively, was the chairman. The fourth council was constituted in January 2009, with Mr. Raphael Oluwole Osayameh as chairman and immediate past pro-chancellor. Chief Lawrence Ayinde Osayemi was the pro-chancellor and chairman of the council. Senator Adeseye Ogunlewe Kingsley, a one-time Minister of Works and Service of the Federation and a former Federal Republic of Nigeria Senator, is the immediate pro-chancellor and chairman of the governing council. Presently, Dr. (Barr.) Aboki Zhawa, an astute administrator, legal luminary, educationalist, and politician, is the pro-chancellor and the chairman of the governing council.

== Chancellors ==
Since its inception, FUNAAB has had four Chancellors:

- Alhaji Kabir Umar, the emir of Katagum in Bauchi State, appointed in 1989,
- Oba Adeyinka Oyekan, the Oba of Lagos (now late). He served from 2001 to 2003,
- Obi (Prof.) Joseph Chike Edozien, the Asagba of Asaba in Delta State, a renowned and retired Professor of Medicine at the University of Ibadan, is the immediate past chancellor.
- The current chancellor is Edidem Ekpo Okon Abasi-Otu (V), the Obong of Calabar, Natural Ruter and the grand Patriarch of the Efik-Ebutytu Kingdom, Rex Maximum Calabarees and the defender of the Christian Faith.

== Vice-Chancellors ==
- The foundational vice-chancellor was Professor Nurudeen Olorunimbe Adedipe, who served for two terms of four years each: 8 January 1988 to 31 December 1991 and 1 January 1992 to 31 December 1995,
- The second vice-chancellor was Professor Julius Amioba Okojie, who acted from 1 January 1996 till 2 September 1996, when he became a substantive vice-chancellor and served for one term of five-year, which ended on 31 August 2001,
- The third vice-chancellor was Professor Israel Folorunso Adu, who served from 1 September 2001 to 31 August 2006.
- Professor Ishola Adamson acted as vice-chancellor from 1 September 2006 till 24 May 2007
- The fourth vice-chancellor, Professor Oluwafemi Olaiya Balogun, was appointed from 24 May 2007 till 23 May 2012.
- Professor Olusola Bamidele Oyewole was appointed the fifth substantive vice-chancellor at the 70th Statutory Meeting of the university's Governing Council on Friday, 20 April 2012. He assumed office on 24 May 2012 – till 24 May 2017.
- Professor Ololade Ade Enikuomehin was recommended and appointed as the acting vice-chancellor by the Senate of the university at its special meeting on 24 May 2017 and served in that capacity till 31 October 2017.
- The sixth substantive vice-chancellor and South Western Nigeria Coordinator (2016–2017), African Cassava Agronomy Initiative (ACAI), Professor Felix Kolawole Salako took over the baton of leadership on 1 November 2017 and ended his tenure in November 2022.
- Professor Olusola Kehinde was appointed as the acting vice-chancellor by the Senate of the university at its special meeting on 1 November 2022.
- Professor Olusola Babatunde KEHINDE, assume office as the 7th substantive vice-chancellor of the Federal University of Agriculture, Abeokuta (FUNAAB) on 1 April 2023, after he has acted as the Ag. Vice-chancellor between 1 November 2022 and 31 March 2023

== Academic programmes ==
The university has 179 academic programmes made up of 45 undergraduate programmes, 135 graduate programmes which include 22 Postgraduate diploma programmes, 57 Master's degree programmes and 56 Doctorate degree programmes.

University colleges are:

College	Departments, programmes, centres, and institutes
COLLEGE OF ENVIRONMENTAL RESOURCES MANAGEMENT (COLERM)	Department of Aquaculture and Fisheries Management; Department of Geology; Department of Environmental Management and Toxicology; Department of Forestry and Wildlife Management; Department of Water Resources Management and Agrometeorology
COLLEGE OF ANIMAL SCIENCE AND LIVESTOCK PRODUCTION (COLANIM)	Department of Animal Breeding and Genetics; Department of Animal Nutrition; Department of Animal Physiology; Department of Animal Production and Health; Department of Pasture and Range Management
COLLEGE OF AGRICULTURAL MANAGEMENT AND RURAL DEVELOPMENT (COLAMRUD)	Department of Agricultural Economics and Farm Management; Department of Agricultural Extension and Rural Development; Department of Agricultural Administration; Department of Communication and General Studies
COLLEGE OF PLANT SCIENCE AND CROP PRODUCTION (COLPLANT)	Department of Crop Protection; Department of Horticulture; Department of Plant Breeding and Seed Technology; Department of Plant Physiology and Crop Production; Department of Soil Science and Land Management
COLLEGE OF BIOLOGICAL SCIENCES (COLBIOS)	Department of Biochemistry; Department of Microbiology; Department of Applied Zoology; Department of Applied Botany
COLLEGE OF FOOD SCIENCES AND HUMAN ECOLOGY (COLFHEC)	Department of Food Science and Technology; Department of Home Science and Management; Department of Nutrition and Dietetics; Department of Food service and Tourism
COLLEGE OF VETERINARY MEDICINE (COLVET)	Department of Veterinary Anatomy; Department of Veterinary Physiology & Pharmacology; Department of Veterinary Pathology; Department of Veterinary Microbiology & Parasitology; Department of Veterinary Medicine & Surgery; Department of Veterinary Public Health & Reproduction
COLLEGE OF ENGINEERING (COLENG)	Department of Agricultural Engineering; Department of Civil Engineering; Department of Electrical and Electronics Engineering; Department of Mechanical Engineering; Department of Mechatronics Engineering
COLLEGE OF PHYSICAL SCIENCES (COLPHYS)	Department of Chemistry; Department of Computer Science; Department of Mathematics; Department of Physics; Department of Statistics
INSTITUTES, CENTRES, AND ACADEMIC ESTABLISHMENTS	School of Postgraduate Studies; Distance Learning Institute; Institute for Continuing Education; Biotechnology Centre

== Academic Planning Unit ==
The Academic Planning Unit is the quality control unit of the university and the link between the university and the National Universities Commission. It is at the centre of all planning activities of the university. The unit is headed by a director, Professor M.A. Waheed, a Principal Planning Officer, Mr. O.O. Bamgbose, and other Planning Officers (Mrs. A.A. Akintunde, Mr. A.O. Kuforiji and Mr. S.A. Dada).

== Library ==
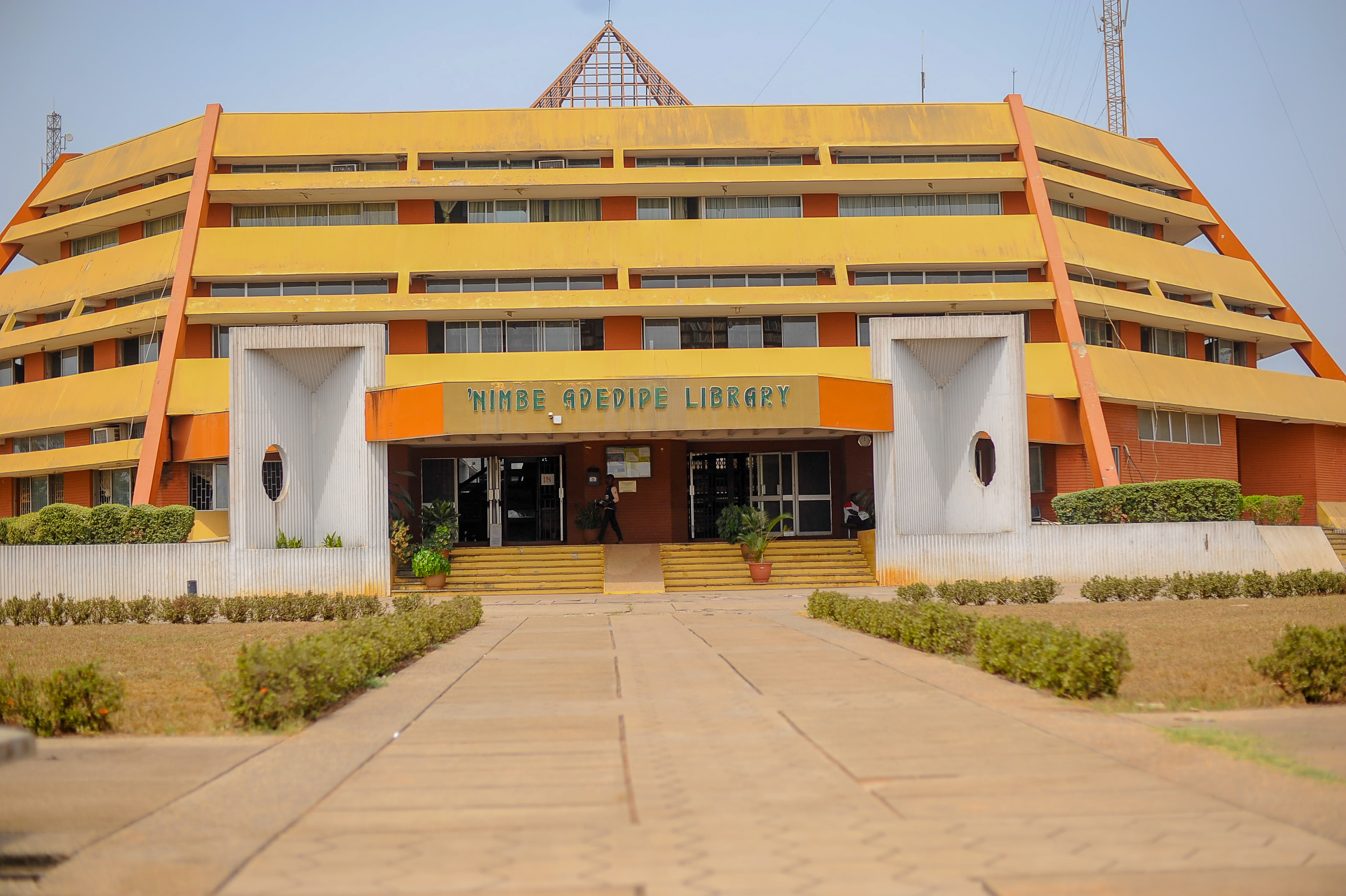
Nimbe Adedipe Library building, FUNAAB

Nimbe Adedipe Library was named in honour of the first vice-chancellor of the university, Professor Nurudeen Olorunnimbe Adedipe. The library building can accommodate 1,000 users at a time. The total collection of books at present is 54,000 titles.

The library started its automation programme in 1994 when it acquired through a World Bank project, an IBM personal computer and the TINLIB library software designed for four workstations. This was later upgraded to ten workstations. The library has since migrated from the DOS-based TINLIB software to a more versatile Windows-based GLAS (Graphical Library Automated System) software with the capability to operate 50 workstations within the library. The OPAC is fully functional, making it possible to catalogue books online and for library clients to access such books immediately. In line with the latest technology advancement, during the 2012/13 session, the library acquired KOHA, an Integrated Library Management Software, enabling users to access library resources services where they are.

== Units, centres and other facilities ==
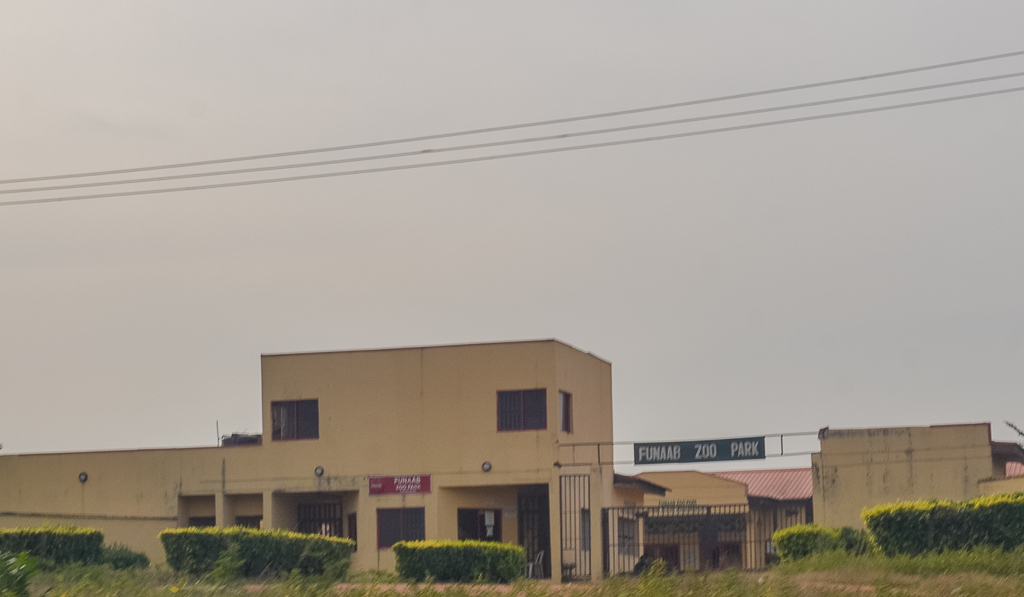
FUNAAB Zoo park, Abeokuta

- Agricultural Media Resources and Extension Center (AMREC)
- Biotechnology Center
- Institute For Human Resources Development (INHURD)
- Leventis Memorial Center for Learning
- ICT Resource Center (ICTREC)
- The Health Center
- Institute of Food Security, Environmental Resources and Agricultural Research (IFSERAR)
- Directorate of Environmental Management (DEM)
- Directorate of University Farms (DUFARMS)
- Directorate of Technologist and Technical Staff (DITTECS)
- Directorate of Grant Management
- Center for Innovation and Strategy in Learning and Teaching (CISLT)
- Sport Center
- SERVICOM
- SIWES
- FMENV/FUNAAB Center
- Center for Community-Based Farming Scheme (COBFAS)
- Center for Internationalization and Partnerships (CENIP)
- Center for Entrepreneurial Studies (CENTS)
- Center of Excellence in Agricultural Development and Sustainable Environment (CEADESE)
- FUNAAB International School
- FUNAAB Staff School
- School of Arts
- UNAAB Consult.
- The Physical Planning Unit
- The Academic Planning Unit
- The Procurement Unit
- The Public Relations
- The Internal Audit
- The Bursary Department
- The Registry
- Student Affairs Division
- Works and Services
- Office of Advancement
- Distance Learning Programme
- FUNAAB Micro-finance Bank
- FUNAAB Radio
- FUNAAB Zoo Park

== Partnerships ==
The university has collaborative partnerships with institutions and establishments, including:

- International Institute of Tropical Agriculture (IITA), Ibadan
- National Seed Services (NSS), Ibadan
- National Cereals Research Institute (NCRI), Badeggi
- National Root Crops Research Institute (NRCRI), Umudike
- Agricultural and Rural Management Training Institute (ARMTI), Ilorin
- National Agricultural Extension and Research Liaison Services (NAERLS), Zaria
- Farm Management Association of Nigeria (FAMAN)
- Ogun State Agricultural Development Project (OGADEP), Abeokuta
- Ministries of Agriculture and Water Resources of both Ogun and Lagos states
- Federal Ministry of Environment
- National Agricultural Land Development Authority (NALDA)
- Afe Babalola University, Ado – Ekiti (ABUAD)
- National Agricultural Research Project (NARP)
- Pan-African Striga Control Network (PASCON), Accra
- West African Rice Development Agency (WARDA), Ivory Coast
- Federal Institute of Industrial Research (FIIRO), Oshodi, Lagos
- Nestle Foods Plc.

Memoranda of Understanding (MOUs) have been signed with the institutions, and collaboration activities are in progress.

At the international level, the Food and Agricultural Organisation (FAO) has entered into collaboration with the university in the areas of training and seminars. The British Council has established an academic link programme between FUNAAB and the University of Reading and the University of Edinburgh, primarily, though not exclusively, in the areas of Plant and Animal Breeding and Seed Technology and Genetics, respectively. Others include the Macaulay Institute of Aberdeen, Scotland, in the area of Sustainable Development and the Africa Rice Center in Rice Science.

- The activities/projects carried out in the centre include:
- Processing of staff application forms for Tertiary Education Trust Fund (TETFUND) approval.
- Processing of application forms of staff sponsored by the University Management on Capacity Building Training Programmes in foreign countries.
- Processing and placement of academic staff on PhD, MSc and PhD bench work sponsored by TETFUND under the Academic Staff Training and Development (AST&D) training programme in foreign institutions.

== Achievements of the Centre for Internationalisation and Partnerships (CENIP) ==
- CENIP has processed TETFUND Conference Intervention Grants for members of staff to attend international conferences.
- CENIP has processed the placement of 26 academic staff on PhD, MSc and PhD bench work programmes sponsored by TETFUND under the Academic Staff Training & Development (AST&D) in foreign institutions.
- Federal University of Agriculture Foreign African Scholarship Scheme (FUFASS), facilitated and sponsored by Federal University Agriculture, Abeokuta, has graduated twenty-one students from the Republics of Sierra-Leone, Liberia and the Gambia under the Skills Acquisition Programmes of the university.
- CENIP has trained members of staff under the FUNAAB Staff Capacity Building/Training Programmes in foreign countries.
- CENIP has organized four international lectures and two international workshops/trainings in conjunction with international organizations.

== Notable alumni ==
Amongst the alumni of the Federal University of Agriculture, Abeokuta and other institutions that fall under that banner are:

- Kizz Daniel, musician
- Olayinka Ramota Karim, Nigerian food scientist and vice chancellor, Fountain University, Osogbo
- Japheth J. Omojuwa, social commentator and blogger
- Oluseun Onigbinde, techpreneur
- Rufai Oseni, TV presenter
- Nkem Owoh, actor

== Other university lectures ==
- 30th Anniversary Maiden Distinguished Lecture Series:- Professor Julius A. Okojie 25 April 2018: A robust Regulatory system: An imperative quality assurance in Nigeria Universities
- 2019 Matriculation commencement Lecture:- Professor Olusegun Ayodeji Osinowo 18 July 2019: Sailing to success
- Valedictory Lecture:- Professor Olufunmilayo Ayoka Adebambo 27 March 2019:The days of small beginning
- Text of an invited talk:-professor Steve o. Afolami: A centre of excellence: its hilltops and valleys, victories and challenges and the way forward.

== See also ==
- List of universities in Nigeria
- Education in Nigeria
