= Ife North =

Ife North Ariwa Ife
- LGA
- Interactive map of Ife North
- Location in Nigeria
- Coordinates: 7°22′N 4°28′E
- Country: Nigeria
- State: Osun State
- Headquarter: Ipetumodu

Government
  - Chairman: Ayoola E. Adeyeba

Area
  - Total: 889 km^{2} (343 sq mi)

Population (2006 census)
  - Total: 153,694
  - Density: 173/km^{2} (448/sq mi)
- Time zone: UTC+1 (WAT)
- 3-digit postal code prefix: 220
- ISO 3166 code: NG.OS.IN

Ife North is a Local Government Area in Osun State, Nigeria. Its headquarters are in the town of Ipetumodu in the north of the area at7°31′00″N 4°27′00″E. The current chairman of the council is Ayoola E. Adeyeba.

It has an area of 889 km^{2} and a population of 153,694 at the 2006 census.

The postal code of the area is 220.

== History ==
Ife North local government area with headquarters at Ipetumodu was created on 3 May 1989. Before its creation, it formed part of the defunct Oranmiyan Local Government area with Ile-Ife as council headquarters. When it was created it consisted of Origbo towns (which are Ipetumodu, Eduanbon, Moro, Yakoyo, Asipa, and Akinlalu) and Modakeke. Modakeke was initially part of the council area. It was during the period of late General Sanni Abacha (1993-1998) when new local councils were created that Modakeke (with three wards) was exercised out of Ife North ad made part of the newly created Ife East Local Government.

== Ife North West LCDA and Ife North Area Council ==
Ife North West LCDA and Ife North Area Council were created out of Ife North for administrative convenience, better development planning and to bring government closer to the grassroot. The LCDA is created by the Government of Osun State and is responsible for the funding of the council. The LCDA is headed by a chairman, vice chairman and other executive and legislative branches similar to the federally recognized local councils. The current chairman of Ife North West LCDA is Okedairo Beatrice Kemi and Ife North Area Council chairman is Oyadosu Isaac Oluropo.

== Geography ==
The land area of Ife North local government area is approximately 889 km^{2} (343 sq mi) which make the local government area the second largest local government area in Osun state. The local government area is bounded in the west and North by Ayedaade Local Government area; in the east by Ife Central and Ife South Local Government areas, and in the south by Ogun State. By the 1991 census, the Population figure of 62,786 males and 62,210 females making a total of 129,996 were recorded for the area. While population of 153,694 were recorded during the 2006 population census. Two federal highways are passing through the Local government council area. These are Ibadan-Ife/Ibadan-Ilesa expressway and the Osogbo/Sekona/Ife roads. State roads, namely Moro/Akinlalu to Oyere and Ipetumodu-Odeomu road also pass through the area.

== Education ==
There are many public and private primary and secondary schools in the local government area. The Obafemi Awolowo University center for distance learning has its campus at Moro, also, Oduduwa University and Foreign links Campus are located in Ipetumodu and Moro respectively, both institutions are privately funded institutions.
