= Kings University =

Nigerian private university

- Type: Private
- Established: 2015
- Chancellor: Matthew Ashimolowo
- Vice-Chancellor: Professor Adenike Kuku
- Location: Odeomu, Osun State, Nigeria; 7°33′53″N 4°24′27″E
- Campus: Urban
- Website: kingsuniversity.edu.ng

Kings University is a private university in Nigeria, founded in 2015 and located in the Odeomu area of Osun State. The university was established by the Kingsway International Christian Centre, a church-owned by Pastor Matthew Ashimolowo, who is also chancellor of Kings University.

The current Vice-Chancellor of Kings University is Professor Adenike Kuku, a Professor of Biochemistry, who assumed office in January 2021 following a successful 'acting position', while she was the acting Vice-Chancellor the previous year.
