= Ipetumodu =

- City
- Nickname: PMD
- Motto(s): Center of creativity and Honeyland
- Location within Nigeria
- Coordinates: 7°29′59.55″N 4°26′49.76″E
- Country: Nigeria
- State: Osun State
- Local Government Area: Ife North
- Founder: Akalako

Government
  - Type: Kingdom
  - Apetumodu: Oba Joseph Olugbenga Oloyede Latimogun I
- Elevation: 239.537311 m (785.88357 ft)

Population (2013 Estimation)
  - Total: 135,000
  - Density: 144/km^{2} (370/sq mi)
- Time zone: UTC+1 (WAT)
- Postal code: 220
- Website: www.ipetumodudevelopmentforum.ng

Ipetumodu (/ɪpeɪtuːmoʊduː/) is a city in Osun State, in the southwestern part of Nigeria. It is the headquarters of the Ife North local government area. The city is under the leadership of traditional ruler with the title of Apetumodu, which means "one who killed an antelope for sacrificial purposes for Odu".

== History ==
Ipetumodu was founded by the warriors Obatala and Orunmila (both are contemporaries of Oduduwa). They came from Ile-Ife to settle near Isasa (Shasha River). Their group fought and drove away the Igbo (Note: Not to be confused with the Igbo ethnicity) aborigines of Ile-Ife who left their original homeland to settle near the river Isasa in Ipetumodu from where they came to invade Ile-Ife. But the Igbo pleaded with them not to trouble them or drive them away from their new abode. Obatala was named "Oseremaigbo" while Orunmila was named "Barapetu". Despite their pleading by the Igbo, they were finally driven out of the Ipetumodu.

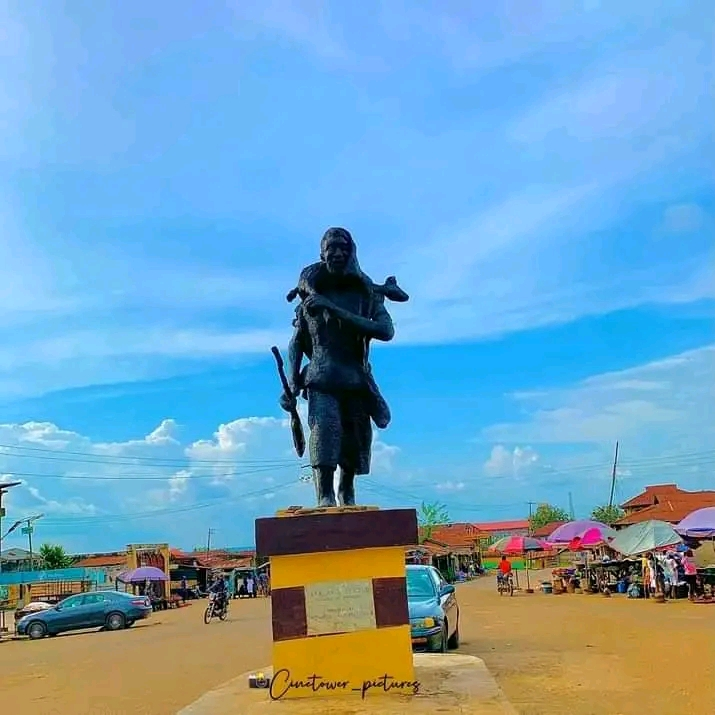
Akalako Statue at Ipetumodu market square

Orunmila and Obatala later left Ipetumodu for Ile-Ife, but left Akalako the son of Obatala in the city. Akalako then became the first king of the city.

=== Ipetumodu and the Nineteen Century Yoruba War ===
During the Owu War (1812-1822), Isope and Iwaro, two Ipetumodu villages, were attacked thereby causing the Exodus of many people. It was after the war that the two villages were rebuilt. Ipetumodu witnessed the arrival of a large number of war refugees from Apomu during the Gbanamu war. The refugees deserted their town in order to escape the impending invasion by the Ibadan army. The people of Ipetumodu repelled most of the military advances of the Ibadan into their territory.

=== Hukuhuku war ===
Between 1839 and 1848, Ipetumodu had its own share of the Fulani attack on Yorubaland. A Mohammedan at Iwo called Mohomi invited the Fulanis of Ilorin to extend their conquest to the towns of Eastern districts of Yorubaland. The Fulani secretly entered ipetumodu from Osogbo end and succeeded in killing several people including the military head of Ipetumodu, balogun Adewusi. So tough was the invasion that the reigning Apetumodu, Oba Folasade Ajiga, with many chiefs and families, fled to Ile-Ife for safety. He died in Ile-Ife in 1842. It was Lafiani popular known as "Arakatampo pa Hukuhuku" (He who used crossbows to kill Hukuhuku) who led the remnants of the Ipetumodu warriors to dislodge the Fulani marauders from Ipetumodu.After the Fulani marauders were dislodged from Ipetumodu, Oba Olakanmi Okoro Giesi succeeded Oba Folashade Ajiga as the Apetumodu and he was responsible for the reconstruction of the war-ravaged town.

=== The 1886 Peace Treaty ===
The 1886 peace treaty initiated by the British to put an end to the Yoruba civil strife also had some traumatic effects on Ipetumodu. The treaty had stipulated that Modakeke, who had been at constant war with their fellow Ife host, would be resettled temporarily in Ipetumodu, Moro and Edunabon and other Origbo towns before their final resettlement by the Osun-Odo Oba confluence between Iwo and Ibadan.

The British authorities however, failed to implement the treaty to the letter early enough and on 27 March 1909, some Modakeke refugees settled in Owu Ipole, Gbongan, Edunabon, Ede, Lasole, and Akanle while many others led by the reigning Ogunsua settled in Ode Omu (which was Originally part of the farmland of Ipetumodu people). On Sunday, 18 July 1909, the Modakekes suddenly and surreptitiously displaced the Ipetumodu farmers who had gone to celebrate the annual "Egungun festival" from their farms.

The British authorities later endorsed the permanent settlement of Modakeke refugees on Ipetumodu land without any compensation.

=== Political History ===
Between 1943 and 1947, Ipetumodu belonged to the Origbo People's Assembly which was represented by six members, which happened to be the highest number in the assembly. The assembly was later changed to Origbo Subordinate Native Authority in 1948 and it lasted till 1954. Ipetumodu had nine out of the twenty members that were made up of the Authority. From 1955 to 1966, ipetumodu was the headquarters of one of the four components of the Ife Divisional Council then known as Ipetumodu Local Council the council consists of thirty members of which twenty-one members are from Ipetumodu, four members from Asipa, three members from Akinlalu while two members are from Yakooyo. Six members from Ipetumodu Local Council could represent it at the Ife Division Council level.

In 1980, Governor Bola Ige, the then Governor of Oyo state grouped Origbo towns as Oranmiyan Local Government Area with headquarters in Ipetumodu. However, the local government was phased out during the regime of Mohammodu Buhari. In the year 1989, the Ife North Local government was created and Ipetumodu has been the headquarters since then.

== Geography ==
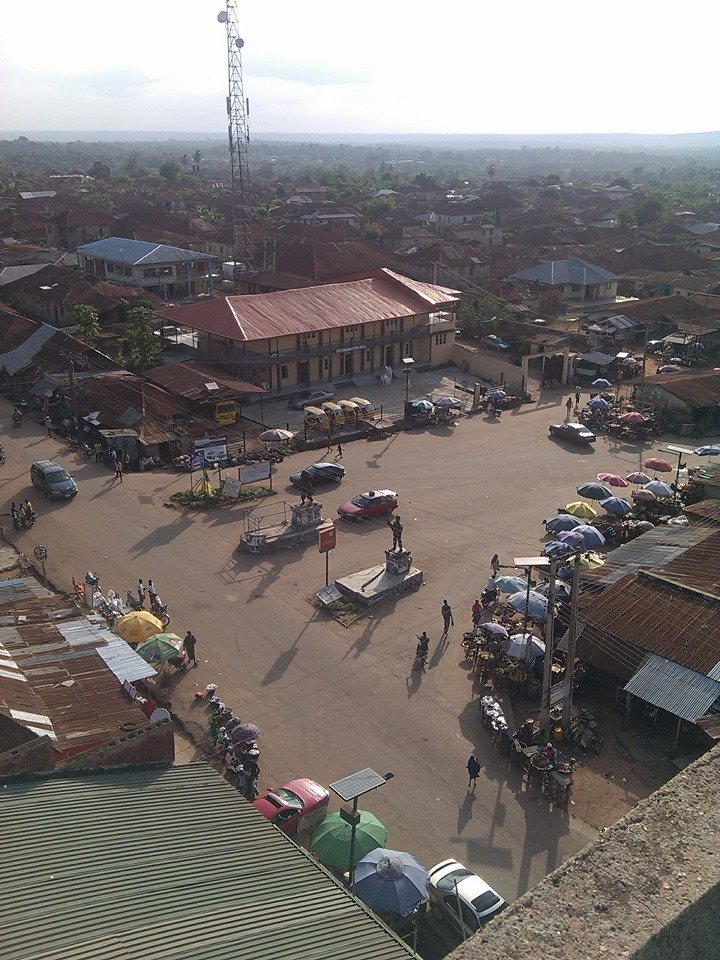
Aerial view of Ipetumodu's market square and town hall

Ipetumodu is located in Yorubaland in western Nigeria. It is located in the high forest also called rain forest. The annual rainfall is estimated to be between 130 and 150 centimetres (51 and 59 inches) annually and humidity of over 80%. This high humidity and long rainy season support the cultivation of perennial cash crops such as cocoa and kolanut tree. Although the town is now fairly urbanized the hinterland west and east of the town center is home to cocoa, oil palm, and kolanut plantations which are usually owned by private individuals from the town.

Ipetumodu is the headquarters of the Ife North local government of Osun State Nigeria. The city is about 218 kilometres (135 miles) from Lagos, the commercial capital of Nigeria. It shares a boundary with Ile-Ife which is the spiritual headquarters of the Yoruba people, Yakooyo, Asipa, Akinlalu, Gbongan and Ode-Omu.

== Religion and Culture ==
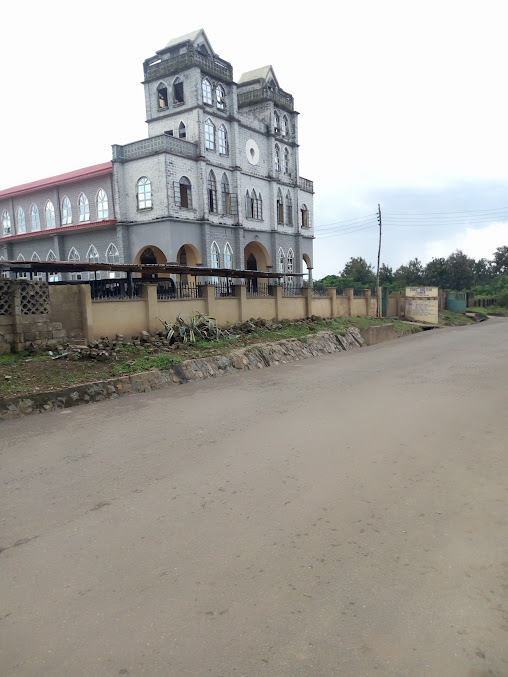
Christ Anglican Church, Waasinmi, Ipetumodu

Ipetumodu's populace practices Christianity and Islam, while, like other Yoruba cities, some still practice the traditional religion. Anglican Church, Catholic Church, The Apostolic Church, Christ Apostolic Church, Methodist Church, Deeper Life Bible Church, The Redeem Christian Church of God, Celestial Church, Cherubim and Seraphim Church, and others are among the Christian churches.

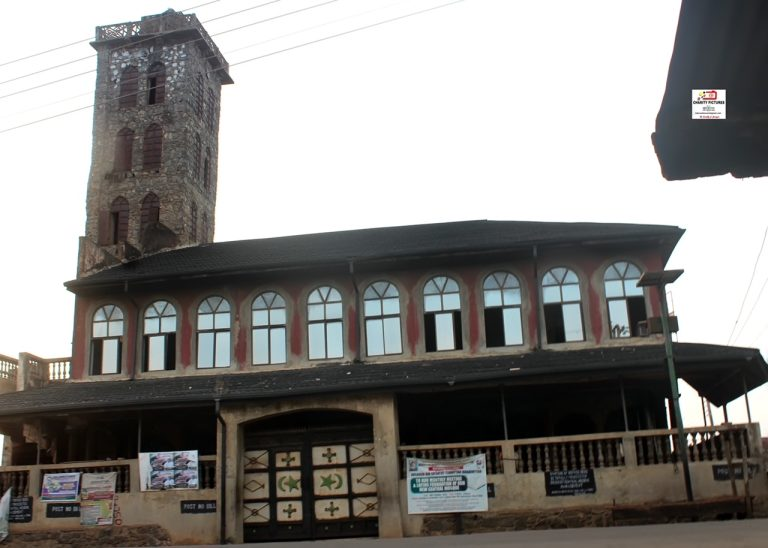
Ipetumodu Central Mosque at Ipetumodu Market Square

The Ipetumodu Central Mosque sits near the Apetumodu Palace on the market square.

=== Egungun Festival ===
Some citizens of the town continue to practice the traditional religion, and there are traditional events to remember it. Although some of the celebrations are considered cultural rather than religious. The egungun festival is one of the celebrations. Every year in July/August, the festival lasts seven days unless there is a reason for another seven-day extension. On the last day of the festival, all of the masquerades gather in Ipetumodu Market Square (in front of the Apetumodu palace) to entertain the crowd. The Apetumodu and his chiefs will greet them and perform the ceremonial blessing.

=== Edi Festival ===
One of the celebrations employed in Ipetumodu for preventive, therapeutic, protective, and productive purposes is the Edi festival. The festival is used to commemorate a courageous woman called Moremi. Moremi was a brave patriot who risked her life to preserve the people of Ile-Ife (the birthplace of the Edi festival) from the constant raids of an outside group known as the "Igbos". The Edi festival of Ipetumodu is one of the testimonies of the close relationship between Ile-Ife and Ipetumodu and also confirms the fact that the city is not newly established. The edi festival is usually presided over by the Apetumodu and his chief priest, - Apena of Ipetumodu.

Traditionally in Ipetumodu, the entire Edi festival lasts for seven days, and on designated days the Apetumodu, chiefs, and other worshipers gather in the palace grounds at 8:00 in the morning to mark the opening of the Edi. The chief priest who is the sole custodian of the opa, removed it from the shrine after an initial brief ritual observance.

== Education ==
Ipetumodu has many primary and secondary schools both private and public own. Some of public primary schools in Ipetumodu includes L.A. Primary School, Christ Church School II, Baptist Day School, St. Augustine Primary School, Ansarudeen Primary School, St. John's Primary School, C.A.C Primary School and, The Apostolic Primary School. Ipetumodu is home to one of the federal government-owned unity schools; Federal Government Girls College, Ipetumodu which was established in 1995. In addition to Federal Government Girls College, Ipetumodu is also home to several other public secondary schools, including L.A. Grammar School, C.A.C Commercial Grammar School, The Apostolic Grammar School, and Origbo Community Unity School. Ipetumodu is a university town of Oduduwa University, located at Ife-Ibadan Expressway Roundabout, Ipetumodu.

== Transportation ==
Ipetumodu is strategically located along Federal Highway A122, which passes through the southern part of the town. This major highway connects Ipetumodu to other parts of the country, including notable cities such as Ife, Ibadan, Ilesha, and Akure.

At the state level, Ipetumodu is served by two Trunk B roads: Moro-Akinlalu Junction Road (8.1 km) and Ipetumodu-Odeomu Road (6.5 km). These roads facilitate connectivity to surrounding towns and cities. Within the town, numerous Trunk C local roads aid circulation, ensuring easy movement of people and goods. This comprehensive network of roads supports Ipetumodu's economic and social development.

Within Ipetumodu, residents and visitors use minibuses, commercial motorcycles (okada), and tricycles (keke) for transportation across the town.

For regional and national travel, Ipetumodu's designated motor parks operate bus services, connecting the town to major cities and states. Key inter-city routes include Lagos, Ibadan, Akure, Ilesha, Ife, and Abuja. These motor parks facilitate seamless movement of people and goods, fostering economic and social growth.

== Markets ==
Ipetumodu has two markets. Obada market is held every fifth day and is located in the city center. The Akinola market is held every Friday. It was strategically located near Ife-Ibadan expressway, which makes it one of the popular markets in Osun state.

== Notable people ==
- Isaac Adeagbo Akinjogbin, Academic, Writer, and Historian.
- Femi Adesina, Special Adviser to President Buhari on media and publicity.
- Solomon Babalola, Nigerian academic, poet and scholar
- O. C. Adesina, Professor of history at University of Ibadan

== See also ==
- Baakun
