= James Adedokun Adegoke Akunraaledoye II =

Teacher and football referee

Akunraaledoye II

Apetumodu
- In office 17 April 1992 – 26 November 2017
- Preceded by: Olaolu Ayoola
- Succeeded by: Joseph Olugbenga Oloyede

Personal details
- Born: 25 December 1934 Ipetumodu, Osun State, Nigeria
- Died: 26 November 2017 (aged 82) Ipetumodu

James Adedokun Adegoke (1934–2017) was a teacher and football referee who became Apetumodu of Ipetumodu in 1992. He is from Asalu compound of Fagbemokun ruling house of Ipetumodu. He was succeeded by Joseph Olugbenga Oloyede (Latimogun I)

== Background ==
Adegoke was born into the Asalu branch of the Fagbemokun ruling house of Ipetumodu in 1934. His parents were Prince Emmanuel Akanni Adegoke and Madam Elizabeth Olasunkanmi Oni Adegoke.

He spent the early part of his childhood with his maternal grandmother at Oke-Osin, Yakoyo. He moved to Ipetumodu when he reached school age and attended several primary schools until he finished his primary school education at Christ School in 1951.

He worked as a store clerk at Ipetumodu, Edunabon and Sekona until 1955 when he taught for one year at Christ Apostolic Church School, Ifetedo. From there, he gained admission into the Divisional Teacher Training College, Ile-lfe, where he obtained the Grade 3 Teachers' Certificate in 1957.

He taught for the next two years until he went to St. Andrew's College, Oyo where he obtained his Grade 2 Teachers' Certificate in December, 1961. He went back to teaching and ended up at CAC. School, Ikire, as the headmaster in 1966. He remained in Ikire Area for the rest of his working career, working in Ikire and Ikoyi as a teacher and headmaster in many primary, modern and secondary schools until he retired in 1989. Except for the one year he spent at the University of Lagos in 1972 on a teacher's diploma course in Yoruba Studies, Adegoke spent all his adult working life in and around Ikire.

Adegoke developed a keen interest in sports very early in life. Everywhere he taught from 1955 until he retired in 1989, he was popular as a games master, leading many of his schools' teams to victory not only in athletics but also in football. It was in football that he became well recognised, not only as a technical Adviser to the Oyo State Sports Council, but also as a member of the Nigerian Referees' Association, of which he became the National Vice President from 1988 to 1989. He was a member of the 1st Osun State Sports Council and handled many important national and international football matches.

An avid student of Yoruba culture, Adegoke was interested in the cultural life of the people. His achievements in this field date back to the old days of the Western Region Festival of the Arts which used to take place in Ibadan. In 1964, his dancing group represented Ife Division at the Festival. The group presented Oluro dance and came second in the Cultural Dance category.

== Reign ==
Adegoke's journey to the throne began in 1970 when he unsuccessfully contested for the vacant stool of Apetumodu. He was not discouraged, and when the stool became vacant again in 1986, he made his interest known. This time he was successful. His candidature was agreed upon by the kingmakers on 20 October 1988. After a successful court case, His Royal Eminence Oba Okunade Sijuwade Olubuse II, Oluaye and Ooni of Ife, consented to Adegoke's appointment on 4 March 1992. The then Executive Governor of Osun State, Alhaji Isiaka Adetunji Adeleke, gave the formal approval of the Osun State Government on 10 April 1992. Adegoke was installed as the 25th Apetumodu of Ipetumodu on 17 April 1992, from which date he was confined to Ilofi where he was prepared for traditional roles. He remained in Ilofi until 17 July 1992, when he moved to the Aafin.

During his reign, Ipetumodu was peaceful and witnessed appreciable development. Federal Government Girls College, Oduduwa University and Akinola International Market, Magistrates Court, District Customary Court, Immigration Office, and some projects by the state government were established in his domain.

== Personal life ==
Adegoke had children and grandchildren. He died in November 2017.
