= Helen Yawson =

Ghanaian gospel singer

- Also known as: Pastor Helen Yawson
- Born: Helen Osagiede Obadagbonyi; 3 July 1967 (age 58); London, England
- Genres: Gospel, urban contemporary gospel
- Occupations: Singer, pastor
- Years active: (1998–present)
- Website: helenyawsonlive.com

Helen Yawson (née Obadagbonyi, born 3 July 1967) is a contemporary gospel singer, songwriter and pastor based in Ghana.

== Personal life ==
Helen Yawson was born in London in 1967. At the age of five, she went to live in Lagos, Nigeria, and returned to London at the age of 19. Her ability to sing was evident from an early age by her powerful and natural confidence in this area.

Shortly after returning to London in 1986, she joined the young Matthew Ashimolowo's Christian ministry where she responded to the challenge to 'get serious with God'. In 1988, Helen initially joined the Kingsway Foursquare Church Band; then in 1989, she joined the Church Choir as a lead Singer. For the next 7 years, her powerful and infectious style led the growing group in praise and worship style performances on several visits to Nigeria and Canada, as well as throughout the UK.

Feeling that she was responding to a call to religious vocation, Yawson moved to Accra, Ghana in 2002 where she was ordained a Reverend Minister in the same year by Matthew Ashimolowo. Helen has served since her arrival in Ghana as The Head of the Music and Creative Division and is currently heads the KICC Winning Women Ministries. Helen Yawson is married to Andrew Yawson, and the couple have two daughters.

== Music career ==
Helen's presence and contribution to the choir and music ministry in Kingsway International Christian Centre, (KICC) came at a crucial time when the church was becoming the fastest growing assembly in the whole of the UK. Under the ministry of her Pastor and teacher, Matthew Ashimolowo, several hundreds of unbelievers came to know Christ. In 1997, Helen's talents were stretched further when she became Music Coordinator at KICC's North London satellite church, directing a group of eight talented singers and musicians, and assisting with the co-ordinating of KICC's main 100 strong Mass Choir.

During this time, Helen also wrote and recorded her debut album, 'Blessed and Highly Favoured', which was released in January 1999. This album increased demand for Helen's inspirational and anointed music ministry around the UK. In the two years that followed, she was kept busy with appearances at several concerts and conferences around the United Kingdom. A year later, she was promoted to the position of Choir Director. She released her second album, 'Forever Grateful' in 2001. In August 2012, she released her current album, My God and I.

Since her coming to Ghana, she has organised and facilitated several music and vocal workshops, worship and lifestyle seminars. She also took part in several concerts and worship events in various parts of Ghana and with various Churches and Christian Organisations. In 2006, she released her single album 'Anyday'. She has also set up Voicemania, a company committed to raising competent and confident musicians as well as speakers to excel in their fields and be able to perform on both local and international platforms. Through this platform she organises the annual Worship Master Class and The Voice Academy.

Her mentors are Helen Baylor, Shirley Caesar and Babbie Mason. She has over the years shared the stage with Andraé Crouch, Alvin Slaughter, Ron Kenoly, Jessy Dixon, Mary Mary and Daniel Winans.

== Discography ==
=== Albums ===
Title	Album details
Blessed and Highly Favoured	Release year: 1997
Forever Grateful	Release year: 2011
Anyday	Release year: 2006
My God and I	Release year: 2012
JUST HYMNS	Release year: 2014

=== Major Singles ===
- Only God
- Anyday

== Accomplishments ==
- In 1988 she joined the Kingsway Four-Square Band and Singers
- Became a member of Kingsway International Christian Centre (KICC) Choir.
- Performed in Nigeria and Canada with Pastor Matthew Ashimolowo as part of the Praise and Worship team.
- Led vocally on the KICC Choir Albums – 1992 "Set me Free", 1993 "You're My Everything" and 1995 "Joy". Helen wrote songs for two of the three albums – "God is Always There" – Set Me Free and "I Will Never Leave You" – You're My Everything.
- 1997 Helen became the Music Co-ordinator at KICC's Tottenham, North London, satellite church.
- Between 1997 and 1998 she embarked on the writing and recording of her debut solo album. In January 1999 she released ' Blessed and Highly Favoured'.
- Appointed as the Choir Director for the KICC Mass Choir in January 2000
- In 2001, she released her second album 'Forever Grateful'
- Helen was the supporting Artiste for Mary Mary at the Queen's Jubilee Concert, KICC London (2002)
- In 2002, she became the music director of KICC Ghana
- Helen has shared the stage with other recognised gospel artists, such as Alvin Slaughter, Jessy Dixon, Ron Kenoly, Andrea Crouch and Daniel Winans.
- She has performed at various conferences, concerts and festivals in Ghana and the UK, including the Cross Rhythms Roots and Branches Festival 'One Voice' held at Dudley Castle (UK), The International Gathering of Champions Conference (UK), the annual 24hr Praise and Worship Concert (Ghana), Receive the Worship Concert (Benin) and many more.
- In 2006, she released her Single Album, Anyday
- In 2012, she released a Worship album, My God and I
- In 2012, she also embarked on her first concert Helen Yawson Live in Concert, which resulted in a live DVD recording
- In 2014, she released an album of Hymns, JUST HYMNS
- In 2015, she released her first book on, More Than A Song
