= Benjamin Aribisala =

African academic (born 1972)

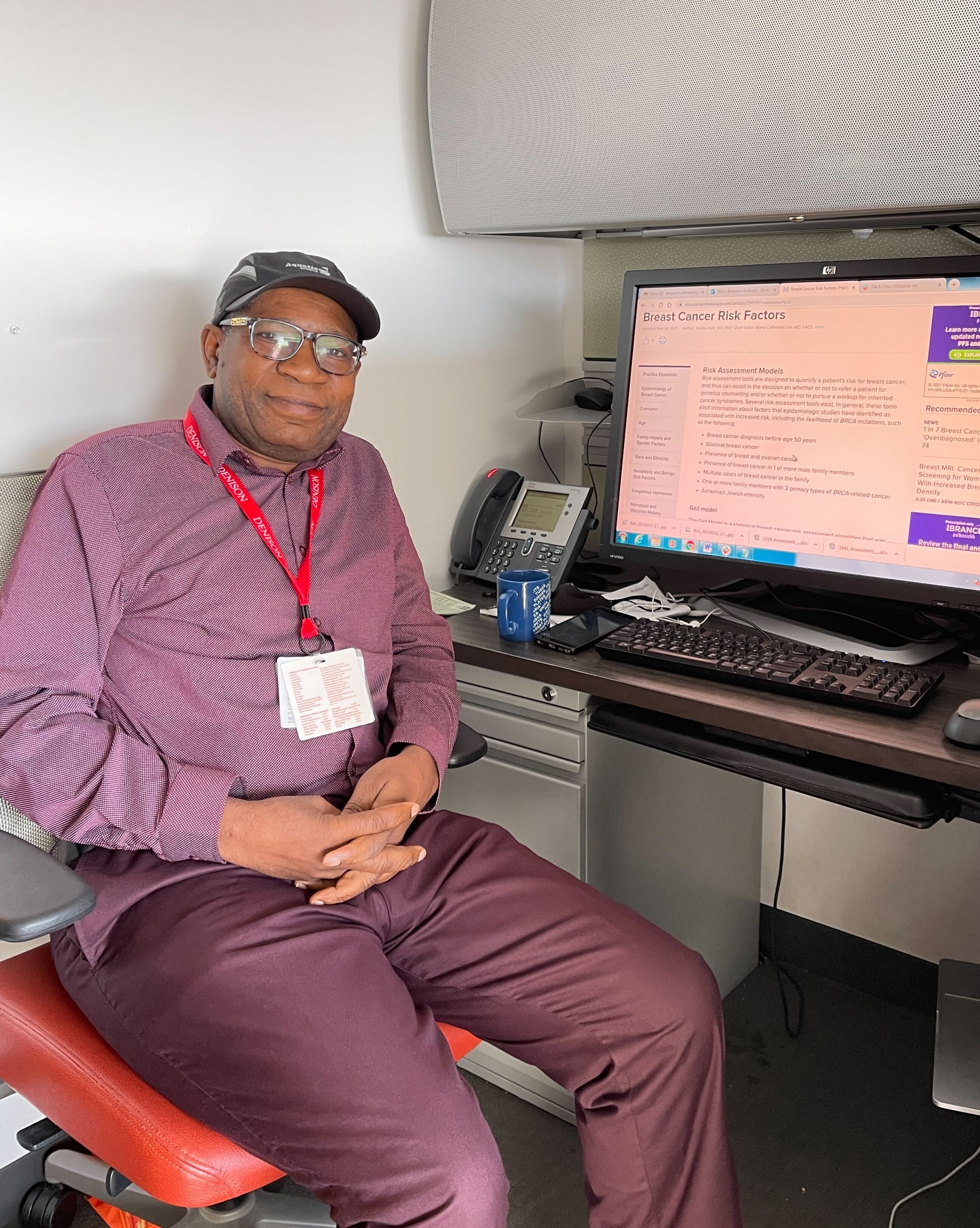

4th Vice-Chancellor of Oduduwa University
- Incumbent
- Assumed office 1 January 2021
- Appointed by: Rahmon Adedoyin
- Preceded by: Chibuzo Nwoke

Personal details
- Born: Benjamin Segun Aribisala; 15 August 1972 (age 53) Ekiti, Nigeria

Benjamin Aribisala (born 15 August 1972) is a Nigerian academic. He is a professor of computer science and he is the immediate past Vice-Chancellor of Oduduwa University.

== Biography ==
He was born in Ikoyi, Ikole local government area, on 15 August 1972. He had his primary and secondary school education in Ikole Ekiti. For University education, he attended Ekiti State University where he obtained a bachelor's degree in mathematics in 1994. He obtained a master's degree in computer science from Federal University of Technology, Akure in 1999. He obtained a PhD degree in computer science from the University of Birmingham, UK in 2006.

== Awards and recognitions ==
- He is a Fulbright Scholar in the University of Chicago.
- He won the Young Investigators award, by the Society for Brain Mapping and Therapeutics, Los Angeles, USA in 2015
- He won the IBM faculty award in 2014. and the British Council Researchers Link award in 2014
