= Baakun =

Ancient town in Yorubaland

According to tradition, Baakun is an ancient town in Yorubaland, and one of the earliest settlements in Ife Empire in Nigeria. Its current monarch is Baale Abiodun Olugbenga Ogundiran.

== History of Baakun ==
The Baakun settlement was founded by Prince Oluopo in the early 11th century. Tradition states that he migrated from Offa-Ile to establish his own settlement at a place very close to Ipetumodu. As a great hunter, Oluopo made marks in several places where he had hunted. He was fond of building huts and establishing his idols such as Ogun and Orisa Ogiyan in those places. The places he established included Pakoto, Tafia, and Oke Oko. He had boundaries with the people of Akanle and Lasole. On their eastern side was the river known as Eri Oogi. The confluence of Eri Oogi with Isasa Elekiri and Oluponna was also in Oluopo’s territory.

== Marriage and origin of name ==
Oluopo later in life met a Princess from Oni Ilare’s Compound in Ile-Ife, who used to be Oluopo’s trading partner. She used to buy bushmeats from Oluopo. They later became friends and eventually got married. The marriage was blessed with three children, Agbangudu, Larele, and Akintayo. Later on in life, the children migrated to different places. Agbangudu migrated to Edu, Larele to Apomu, and Akintayo to Ibadan whose grand children became an Olubadan later in life. Around Oluopo’s hut were plenty of shrubs called Ookun. The shrubs were so many that they formed a very thick cluster known as Iba. These two names, Iba and Ookun, were put together by Oluopo and all his customers as well as passers-by to name his settlement as Iba Ookun (thick cluster of shrubs) and which later on became Baakun as it is known today.

== Influx of Modakeke people ==
Upon the departure of Modakeke people from Oyo Alaafin, their first place of settlement was at Baakun where they practiced their art of blacksmithing. Baakun people, being hunters and farmers, received the Modakeke people warmly because of their work as blacksmiths. They were good sources of tools like hoes, cutlasses, and guns for their farming and hunting.

== Allocation of land for farming ==
Oluopo used to give pieces of land to people for farming in his territory. Notable among these people was Oluode Ogunwole Olojoarere, the Oosa of Ipetumodu at the time. The area given to Ogunwole was known as Apata Ogunwole. One of the grandchildren was Vincent Olaniyan who also later held the chieftaincy title of Oosa Apetumodu between 1940 and 1969.

== Hukuhuku war ==
There was a revolution in Yoruba land that affected many people adversely. During the war, Oluopo sons went to war and fought in many battles that cut across Yoruba land. After the war, Agbangudu settled in Ede, Larele settled in Apomu, Akintayo settled in Ibadan while other children lived with their father, Oluopo.

After the civil war, Oluopo returned to his farmland at Tafia. While going from Baakun in Ipetumodu, he took some friends along and gave them lands for farming. Those he took along included Prince Olakanmi Okoro Giesi, who later became Oba Apetumodu who reigned between 1848–1866. Others were Adegbanro, Akingbile, Aroje the father of Mojalawo.

== Loss of farmland ==
When Modakeke was depopulated in 1909 to 1910, the majority of the people came to settle on Oluopo land at Tafia. Baakun people vehemently protested against this to the then District Officer (D.O). Two notable people in Baakun that led the protest to the D.O. were Abodunrin and Akinwale (who later became the Ekefa Apetumodu between 1936 and 1963). Even after proving the ownership of the land beyond reasonable doubt to the D.O., which included showing the D.O. their idols of worship that were situated on the land, Baakun people still lost the protest because the D.O. wanted to secure land at all cost for the depopulated Modakeke people.

However, before the D.O. took this decision, he told the Baakun people to make the farmland their permanent abode and be under Ibadan or be ready to forfeit it. Baakun people however sought the advice of their royal father, Oba Olubuse I, who advised them not to do so because he would not want his people to be absorbed to Ibadan District. He promised to give them another place for their farming and to settle. That was how Modakeke refugees were brought to the place, Baakun farmland, which is today known as Ode –Omu.

== Occupations ==
Baakun people are hardworking, industrious, and enterprising. They are traditionally known for farming and hunting. The women are also noted to be supportive of their husbands in commercial activities including selling of their husbands’ farm produce and bushmeats. They also do palm kernel crushing, palm oil making, and also production of food item from maize like pap and the solid ‘eko’.

Today, Baakun peoples’ occupation has been greatly diversified. Most of the older generations are still farmers. They are noted for having two categories of farmland based on distance to home, ‘oko etile’ (nearby farmland), and ‘oko iwaju’ (distanced farmland). The younger generations are made up of people who are mainly literate and are highly endowed with knowledge that adequately prepared them to constitute a virile and productive workforce in many sectors of Nigerian economy including public service, manufacturing, banking, information technology, and theological vocations.

== Culture and religion ==
Baakun people are Oyos like most people surrounding them in other adjourning towns including Ipetumodu and other Origbo towns. Even though Baakun are traditionally idol worshipers with Ogun, Orisa nla, Egungun, and Oya as some of the gods they worship. Today, Baakun people are predominantly Christians with almost 65% being Christ Apostolic Church members and this could probably explain why the largest CAC Church in the entire Ife Division is located in Baakun. Other churches including both Orthodox and Pentecostals are prevalent also.
