= Apetumodu =

Traditional title for the ruler of Ipetumodu

Apetumodu is a traditional title of the ruler of Ipetumodu, a notable town in Osun State, Nigeria. The Apetumodu is a first-class Oba and the Deputy Chairman of the Osun State Council of Kings. Akalako was the first Apetumodu. The current Apetumodu is Oba Joseph Olugbenga Oloyede Latimogun I, who ascended the throne in 2019.

== History and Origins ==
According to oral tradition and historical texts such as The Cradle of a Race, Ipetumodu was founded during the same period as Ile-Ife, estimated around the 10th century A.D. The town is situated west and north-west of Ife, strategically positioned along historical trade routes and near the Osun and Isasa rivers.

== The Foundation of the Stool ==
The first Apetumodu was Akalako, a prominent aide and contemporary of Oduduwa. During the early dispersal of Yoruba princes from Ile-Ife, tradition holds that those heading west and north (including the Alake of Egbaland, the Alaketu of Ketu, the Alaafin of Oyo, and the Orangun of Ila) first gathered at Ipetumodu. They remained there briefly before moving on to found their respective kingdoms. Consequently, these princes are traditionally expected to stop at Ipetumodu for ritual engagements before proceeding to Ile-Ife.

The Apetumodu holds a distinct position within the hierarchy of Yoruba traditional rulers.

== Dynasties and Succession ==
The history of the Apetumodu stool is divided into three major dynastic periods:

1. Akalako Dynasty: The founding dynasty, which is said to have produced up to 24 rulers, though only nine names are preserved in current oral history.
2. Kiaje Dynasty: A subsequent dynasty that succeeded the Akalako line.
3. Fagbemokun Dynasty: The modern ruling dynasty that succeeded the Kiaje.

== Past Apetumodu of Fagbemokun Dynasty ==
Apetumodu	Compound	Period
Fagbemokun	Ipetumodu	1558–1612
Olugusi Lapoorin	Kiaje/Latimogun	(Died at Ilofi)
Aremu Abubiekun	Asalu	1612–1626
Oba Adelakun	Aroje	1626–1643
Adekanhinbi	Asalu	1643–1666
Aribile	Elewa	1666–1693
Adeyinka O. Aderikan	Aroje	1693–1703
Adewarikan	Ofigbodogi	1703–1714
Adeyemi Adelakun	Aroje	1714–1735
Ojo Awelorun	Aaje/ofigbodogi	1735–1747
Ejiwumi Agunloye	Onisungbe/omosempe	1747–1763
Elebiti Ayaledoye	Ajiga	1765–1789
Ibigboye Obarumiloju	Asalu	1789–1799
Oluwolo Onisungbe	Onisungbe/omosempe	1799–1821
Folashade Ajiga	Ajiga	1821–1842
Olakanmi Okoro Giesi	Agbe	1842–1866
Oluyalo Arojojoye	Aroje	1866–1885
Adewumi Arowoosun	Arowoosun	1885–1903
Oyewobi Akunraaledoye	Asalu	1903–1909
Adeyemi Maborukoje	Aroje	1909–1928
Idowu Akinwowo	Abelebo	1928–1947
Samson Ayoola Oyebode	Ajiga	1947–1970
Solomon Oloyede	Aaje	1971–1980
Olaolu Ayoola	Elewa/ajiga	1983–1986
James Adedokun Adegoke Akunraaledoye II	Asalu	1992–2017
Joseph Olugbenga Oloyede	Latimogun	Incumbent
