= A122 =

A122 may refer to:

- A122 road (England), a designation reserved for the planned Lower Thames Crossing
- A122 road (Malaysia), in Perak
- A122 highway (Nigeria)
- RFA Olwen (A122), a 1964 tanker of the Royal Fleet Auxiliary
