= Shasha River =

River of Nigeria

Location
- Country: Nigeria
- State: Osun State

Physical characteristics
- Mouth
  - location: Lekki Lagoon
  - coordinates: 6.563502°N 4.208417°E

The Shasha River or Sasa River (Yoruba: Odo Shasha) is a river in Lagos, Ogun and Osun States in Nigeria. The landscape varies from rainforest in the north to mangrove swamps in the south.

== Course ==
The Shasha River is a river in southwestern Nigeria that flows through the states of Osun, Ogun, and Lagos. It originates from Shasha village in the Ife region of Osun State and flows southwest for approximately 50 kilometres before emptying into the Lekki Lagoon. The river passes through several towns, including Ipetumodu, Odeomu, and Edunabon, before reaching its mouth at the Lekki Lagoon. Along its course, the Shasha River drains a significant portion of the southwestern Nigerian landscape, including the Osun River basin and the campus of Obafemi Awolowo University. The river also passes through several villages, including Eyentanle, Kinkinyiun, Odeyinka, Ogbaagba, Sunmoge, and others, providing water and supporting the livelihoods of local communities. The river's flow is influenced by the humid climate of the region, with the highest water levels typically occurring during the rainy season.

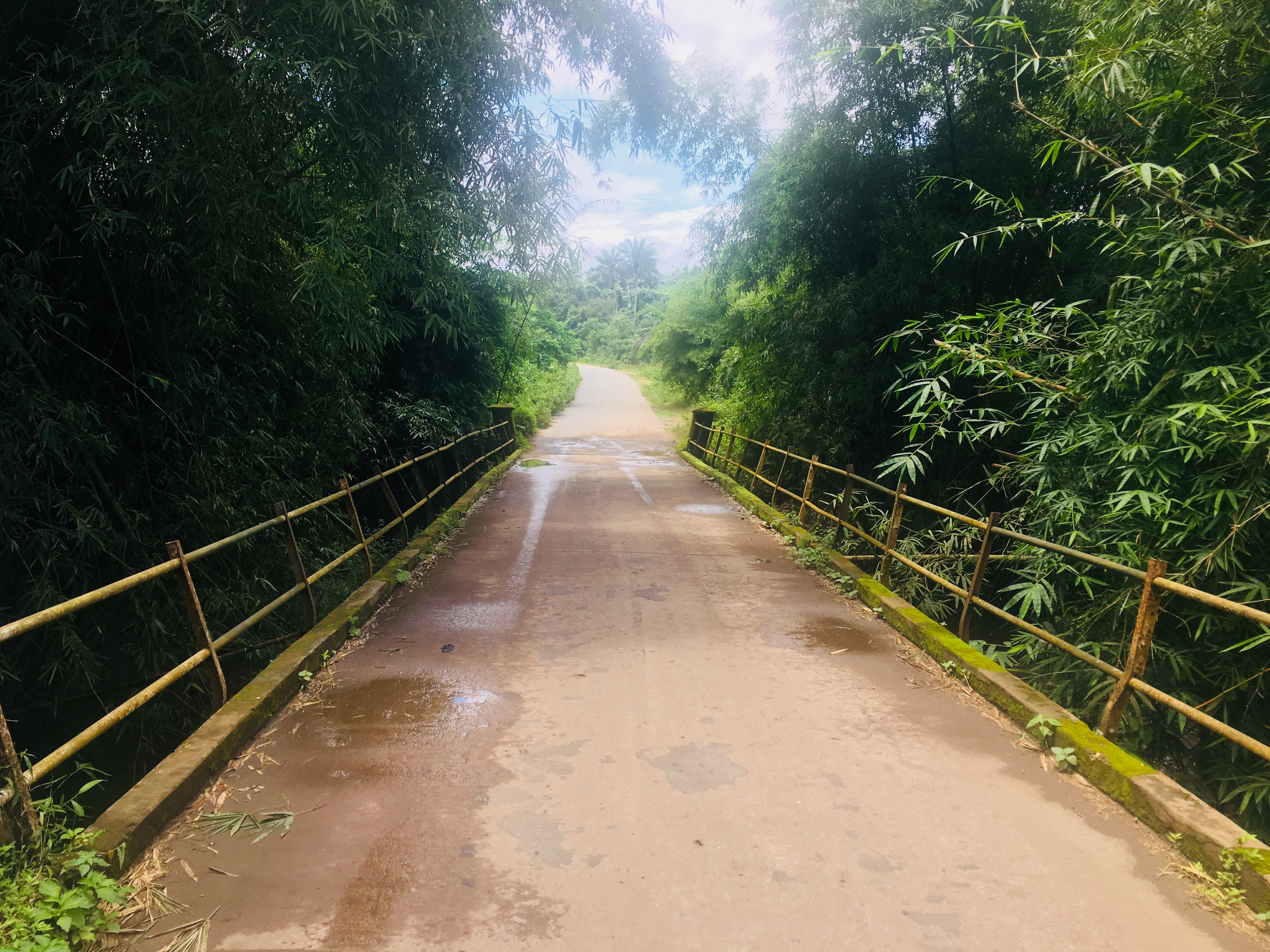
Shasha Bridge on Ipetumodu-Odeomu Road, Ipetumodu, Osun State

The Shasha River, a significant watercourse in the Ogun-Osun River Basin, flows into the Lekki Lagoon at Imobi via Epe. Its tributary, River Opa, connects to the Osun River, while Rivers Owena and Oni converge into the Shasha River before it ultimately empties into the Lekki Lagoon.

=== Environment ===
The region has two distinct seasons: a wet season and a dry season. The wet season typically runs from June to October, with the highest rainfall occurring in July and September. The dry season lasts from November to May.

The river's environment is home to a total of 121 recorded phytoplankton species, belonging to 13 taxonomic groups. Bacillariophyta is the most represented group, with 53 species, contributing 43.80% of the total phytoplankton groups.

The river's water is contaminated with organic materials, indicating mesosaprobic conditions. This pollution poses a significant threat to the river's ecosystem and the people who depend on it for their livelihood.

Despite these challenges, River Shasha remains an essential resource for the people of Southwest Nigeria, supporting agriculture, fishing, and recreation. Its watershed is home to a population of approximately 75,000 people, who rely on the river as their primary source of water for drinking and domestic use.
