= Toriola =

Nigerian given name

- Gender: Unisex
- Language: Yoruba

Origin
- Origin: Nigerian
- Meaning: "Because of wealth"
- Region of origin: South-west Nigeria

ToriolaToriola is a Nigerian surname of Yoruba origin, meaning "Because of wealth" or "For the sake of success," often used in southwestern Nigeria. The name is derived from the components "nítorí" (because of) and "ọlá" (success or wealth). Morphologically, it is written as (ní)torí-ọlá.

== Notable people with the surname ==
- Karl Toriola – Nigerian business leader.
- Wumi Toriola – Nigerian film actress.
- Segun Toriola (born 1974) Nigerian table tennis player.
