= Federal Government Girls College, Ipetumodu =

Location
- Federal Government Girls College; Ipetumodu, Osun State; Nigeria; 7.5255°N 4.4298°E

Information
- Type: Day and Boarding
- Motto: Prounitate
- Established: May 15, 1995
- Status: open
- Principal: Mrs. Umanah Martha P.
- Gender: Female
- Enrollment: 1500 (2013 estimate)
- Colour: blue
- Nickname: FEGGI CITY

Federal Government Girls College, Ipetumodu is a federal government owned secondary school located in Ipetumodu, Osun State, Nigeria. FGGC Ipetumodu is one of the unity schools established by the federal government in 1995 to cater specifically for girl child education.

== History ==
FGGC Ipetumodu was established by the federal government on May 15, 1995, to extend unity secondary schools to Osun State. Previously, 13 unity schools were created in 1974 in other States in Nigeria by the military administration of General Yakubu Gowon. FGGC Ipetumodu replaced Teachers' College Ipetumodu in 1995.

== Facilities ==
It provides boarding facilities for some of her students. According to information on the official website, the school has a modern academic and sporting facilities including a football pitch, school library, and science laboratory.

== Principals ==
- Mrs. M.B. Abolade (May 1995-Feb.2001)
- Mrs. E.O. Babaniji (Feb.2001-Mar. 2004)
- Mrs. R.A. Jeje (Mar. 2004-Dec.2005)
- Mrs. M. U. Renner (Jan.2006-Sept.2008)
- Dr.(Mrs.) O.S. Salam (Sept.2008-July 2014)
- Mrs. M.K. Borha (July.2014-Mar..2018)
- Mrs. Titilope Akinyemi (Mar.2018-Nov.2019)
- Mrs. M.P. Umanah (Nov.2019–present)
