= Festus Onigbinde =

Nigerian football manager (1938–2026)

Personal information
- Full name: Festus "Adegboye" Onigbinde
- Date of birth: 5 March 1938
- Place of birth: Modakeke, Colony and Protectorate of Nigeria
- Date of death: 9 March 2026 (aged 88)

Managerial career
- Years: Team
- 1981–1984: Nigeria
- 2002: Nigeria

Festus "Adegboye" Onigbinde (5 March 1938 – 9 March 2026) was a Nigerian football manager.

== Biography ==
Onigbinde was born in Modakeke. He coached Nigeria national team at the 2002 FIFA World Cup, an achievement he had already gotten, between 1982 and 1984. In 1984, Onigbinde took Nigeria into the final match of the 1984 Africa Nations Cup. Nigeria lost 1–3 to Cameroon in that match. Later in 1984, he took over as coach of Shooting Stars Sports Club in Ibadan and took the Club to the final of the Africa Club Champions Cup. They lost the finals to Zamalek of Egypt.

He took over the Nigerian national team after the sacking of the coaching crew of Shuaibu Amodu following what was considered a disgraceful performance of the Super Eagles at the 2002 Africa Nations Cup. Onigbinde took a team that consisted largely of young and inexperienced players. But the Japan/South Korea edition was the worst Nigerian performance in the World Cup history: for the first time in this competition, Nigeria did not win a single match and was knocked out of the tournament in the first round.

In the first game they lost 0–1 to Argentina, after a goal of Gabriel Batistuta. In the second match, against Sweden, Nigeria lost 1–2 after leading 1–0, meaning the elimination of the World Cup. The third game was a goalless draw to England.

After the World Cup, some Nigerian players, like Jay-Jay Okocha and Julius Aghahowa, criticized Onigbinde for nominating the wrong players.

However, some of the players remained in the Super Eagles for many years. Onigbinde remained a highly respected Nigerian soccer tactician. He has served as CAF and FIFA Technical instructor.

According to Onigbinde himself, on BBC Sport Online, Adegboye was not one of his original names: 'I dropped my baptismal name 'Festus' in 1960 through Nigeria's Daily Times newspaper and have been answering [no 'to'] Adegboye Onigbinde...I discovered Festus didn't mean anything, so I changed to 'Adegboye', meaning 'a child born to reclaim a chieftaincy title'.

Onigbinde died on 9 March 2026, at the age of 88. The family announced his death in a statement signed by Bolade Adesuyi.

== Legacy and coaching philosophy ==
Onigbinde has been noted by sports commentators for a coaching philosophy centered on discipline, technical integrity, and an uncompromising adherence to professional standards. Often described as a "principled" or "stubborn" tactician, he prioritized character and long-term player development over short-term popularity or administrative convenience. This approach often placed him at odds with the political pressures within Nigerian football administration, where he remained a vocal advocate for transparency and the rejection of "shortcuts" in team management.
