= Isaac Adeagbo Akinjogbin =

Nigerian writer and historian (1930–2008)

- Born: 1930; Ipetumodu, Nigeria
- Died: 27 July 2008 (aged 77–78)
- Education: Fourah Bay College; University of Durham
- Occupations: Writer; academic; historian
- Writing career
- Notable works: Dahomey and Its Neighbours, 1708–1818

Isaac Adeagbo Akinjogbin, also known as I. A. Akinjogbin, was a Nigerian writer and historian. Akinjogbin engaged in extensive and thorough cultural and historical research, looking into a variety of Yoruba cultural, historical, and ideological processes and issues. Most African historiography considers the well-known work Dahomey and Its Neighbors, 1708–1818 to be a masterpiece.

== Life and work ==
Akinjogbin, who was born in 1930 in Ipetumodu, Ife North Local Government Area, Osun State, Nigeria, attended Christ Church School Ipetumodu and Origbo Central School, Ipetumodu between 1940 and 1946. He also attended Ijebu Ode Grammar School between 1946 and 1950, Fourah Bay College in Freetown between 1952 and 1954, and later the University of Durham in England, where he earned his B.A. (Hons.) in Modern History in 1957.

Akinjogbin served as a Junior Research Fellow for the Yoruba Historical Research Scheme, which was run by Saburi Biobaku, between 1957 and 1960. He was sent back to England in this capacity to undertake research at the London Public Records Office. He was appointed a Commonwealth Scholar at the University of London's School of Oriental and African Studies in 1960. He received a Ph.D in African History in 1963. He began working at the University of Ife in the same year as a lecturer in the history department. He was named the Institute of African Studies' acting director in 1965, and in 1968, after being promoted to full professor, he was named the department's permanent head. He later became the Deputy Vice-Chancellor of Obafemi Awolowo University.

== Works ==
- War and Peace in Yorubaland, 1793–1893
- The impact of iron in Yorubaland
- Olókun; iwe àtìgbàdégbà ni Àtàtà Yoruba 2 September 1960
- Dahomey and Its Neighbours, 1708–1818
