= Origbo =

Cluster of seven sister towns in Nigeria

Total population
- ~ 250,000 (2013)

Regions with significant populations
- Osun State · Ife North: 250,000

Languages
- Yoruba language

Religion
- Christianity · Yoruba religion · Islam

Origbo (also known as Origbo Meje) is a cluster of seven sister towns in Ife North Local Government Area of Osun State, southwestern Nigeria. The towns are Ipetumodu, Moro, Asipa, Edunabon, Akinlalu, Yakooyo and Isope. It is about six kilometres from Ile Ife, the traditional heart of Yoruba culture, and their inhabitants speak the Oyo dialect of Yoruba. Ife North, the second largest local government area in Osun by land area, also contains many villages that together with the seven towns form a culturally cohesive unit known as Origbo Meje. The seven sister towns share a single urban footprint within the region.
