= Francis Adedoyin =

Nigerian Monarch (1922–2018)

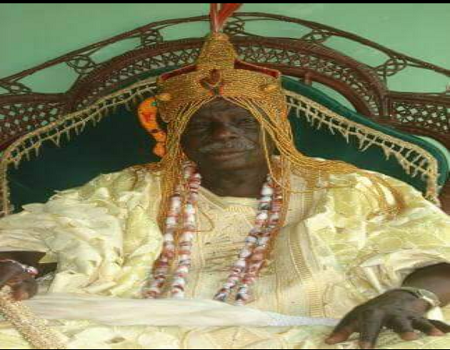
Late Oba Francis Adedoyin, the former Ogunsua of Modakeke

Oba Francis Adedoyin (January 1922, in Tonkere – August 5, 2018) was the Ogunsua or traditional ruler of Modakeke, he comes from Olaogbin Royal family in Modakeke. He was one of the wealthiest rulers and a popular Oba in the Yorubaland.

He was crowned in 1994 originally and crowned with the beaded crown in 2009. On August 5, 2018, he was announced dead after a brief illness at Our Lady of Fatima Catholic Hospital, Jaleyemi, Osogbo in Osun State.

== Sources ==
- Ogunsua, Modakeke monarch, Oba Francis Olatunji Adedoyin joins his ancestor at 96
- Modakeke.info: Nigeria: Modakeke: Monarch Returns After 7-Month Exile (28 Oct 2003)
- Peace At Last, As Ogunsua, Modakeke Chief, Becomes Oba (9 February 2009)
- OsunDefender.org: Ogunsua of Modakeke – Oba Francis Adedoyin (6 Oct 2009)
