= The Polytechnic, Ile-Ife =

- Type: Private
- Established: 1984
- Affiliations: National Board for Technical Education
- Principal: Dr. Rahmon Adedoyin
- Students: Over 8,300
- Location: (Nigeria) Ile Ife, Osun State, Nigeria; 7°29′13″N 4°32′08″E
- Campus: Urban
- Website: thepolytechnicife.com

The Polytechnic, Ile-Ife, formerly Universal Turorial College, is a private-owned tertiary institution located in the ancient city of Ile Ife, Osun State. Founded in 1984 by Rahmon Adedoyin, the polytechnic is recognized by the National Board for Technical Education after it was accredited in 2009. The Polytechnic, Ile-Ife offers National Diploma and Higher National Diploma courses at undergraduate levels.

== See also ==
- List of polytechnics in Nigeria
