= Opa River =

River in Nigeria

The Opa River is a significant watercourse in southwestern Nigeria, flowing through the city of Ile-Ife and the Obafemi Awolowo University campus. It is a tributary of the Shasha River and plays a crucial role in the hydrological landscape of the region.

== Geography and geomorphology ==
The Opa River is situated in southwestern Nigeria, flowing through the city of Ile-Ife and the Obafemi Awolowo University campus. It spans approximately 40 km (25 mi) in length, originating from the Ile-Ife hills. The river's location within the tropical region influences its hydrological characteristics. Geologically, the Opa River's catchment area is underlain by crystalline basement rocks, comprising granite, gneiss, and schist. This complex geological setting shapes the river's geomorphic features. The river's course is characterized by a mix of NE-SW and NW-SE trends, reflecting the influence of differing lithologies and tectonic activities. The Opa River's geomorphic features include a 4th-order channel, with varying stream lengths and densities. The stream segment density ranges from 0.08 km to 4.33 km, indicating increased fracture control of streams from lower to higher stream order. The drainage density is relatively high, with a variable slope. The river's drainage pattern is dendritic, with tributaries flowing from the surrounding hills into the main river course. The confluence factor is moderate to high, while the form factor is relatively elongated, and the elongation ratio is moderate to high. These characteristics contribute to the river's hydrological dynamics. The Opa River's catchment area covers approximately 110 km^{2}, encompassing residential quarters, research farms, and rural communities. The catchment's topography, land use, and geology interact to influence the river's water quality, aquatic life, and surrounding ecosystem.

== Hydrology ==
The Opa River's water flow is characterized by seasonal variations, with high flow during wet seasons (April–October) and low flow during dry seasons (November–March). Peak flow typically occurs in July–August, while base flow is maintained by groundwater recharge. This variability in flow has significant implications for water resource management and aquatic ecosystems. River Opa's water quality is influenced by several factors, including agricultural runoff from surrounding research farms and rural communities, urbanization impacts from Ile-Ife city and Obafemi Awolowo University campus, and geology, with underlying crystalline basement rocks contributing to water hardness. These factors contribute to changes in water quality, affecting aquatic life and human usage.

The River Opa faces hydrological challenges, including flooding during heavy rainfall events, siltation due to increased sediment load, and water pollution from agricultural and urban runoff.

== Opa Reservoir ==
The Opa Reservoir is a man-made water body located within the Obafemi Awolowo University campus in Ile-Ife, southwestern Nigeria. Created in 1978, the reservoir serves as a primary water supply scheme for the university community.

The reservoir's physical characteristics include a length of 2.5 km, a width of 0.8 km, and a catchment area of approximately 110 km^{2}. This expansive catchment area comprises the University Research Farm, Residential Quarters, Central Campus, Ile-Ife, and surrounding rural communities. Initially designed to provide a reliable water source for the university, the reservoir has undergone significant changes over the years. The direct linkage of township drains and streams to the reservoir has led to excessive sediment deposition, compromising its water storage capacity. This has resulted in various environmental implications, including altered hydrological dynamics, decreased water quality, and affected aquatic life.

In response to the devastating July 2011 flooding, the Osun State Government undertook a comprehensive rehabilitation project. The channels of the Ogbe Esimirin River, a primary tributary of the Opa River, were cleared, widened, and dredged up to the university boundary. Although intended to mitigate flooding, this project inadvertently facilitated siltation and impeded the flow of the Opa River at its inflow point.

== Importance and conservation ==
The Opa River and Dam play vital roles in shaping the hydrological characteristics of the Obafemi Awolowo University campus. River Opa plays a vital role in the ecological, social, and economic well-being of the surrounding communities. Its importance extends to providing potable water for residential, agricultural, and industrial purposes, supporting irrigation for crops and livestock, and contributing to food security. Additionally, the river maintains biodiversity, regulates water cycles, and mitigates climate change, offering opportunities for fishing and eco-tourism. It also holds spiritual and cultural value for local communities.

The river's ecosystem services are crucial for maintaining the delicate balance of the environment. However, River Opa faces numerous threats, including deforestation and land degradation, pollution from agricultural runoff and industrial waste, climate change and variability, over-extraction of water resources, and inadequate waste management. These threats necessitate urgent conservation efforts to ensure the river's long-term sustainability.
