= Olusola Amusan =

Nigerian social entrepreneur (born 1990)

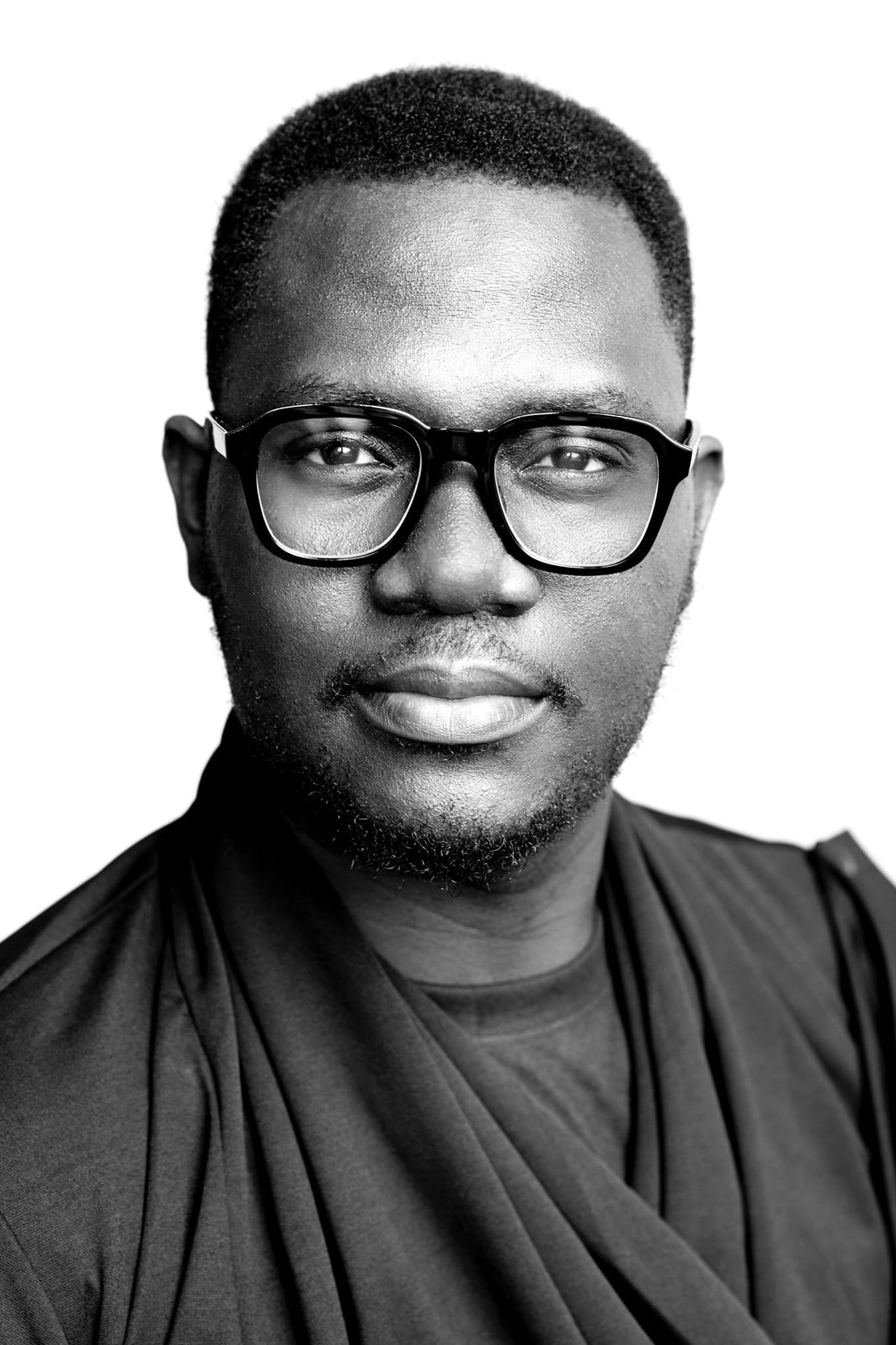
Olusola Amusan

Olusola Amusan (born February 24, 1990) is a Nigerian social entrepreneur, speaker and youth advocate. He was the leader, Philanthropies and Corporate Social Responsibility at Microsoft Nigeria. He was the 2017-2018 curator for the Global Shapers Community of the World Economic Forum in Lagos. He is known for his work as an Artificial Intelligence Evangelist.

Before venturing work at a technology company Coven Works, he managed all non-profit and youth engagements for Microsoft in Nigeria, an inspirational speaker and inspiration to the nearly 60,000 young people he trained in the 5 years. At Microsoft, among other things, Olusola was known for advocating for cloud technologies, Azure and Office 365. In 2018, Amusan and a team at Coven Works were accepted alongside others including Muster.ng into the C5 accelerator in Washington, D.C., as part of 4 African Startups to be accepted into the 5th cohort of the 8 weeks accelerator.

== Early life ==
He grew up in Modakeke, Osun State. He was first of four boys, born to a teacher father and a health records officer mother. His father, Olawale Saka Amusan is an entrepreneur and politician who went on to serve as chairman of the Ife East area office in Modakeke. His mother, Oluwatoyin Mobolaji Amusan, is a public servant at the health records department of the Obafemi Awolowo teaching hospital. While growing up in Modakeke, Olusola volunteered for Society for Women and Aids in Africa at 9 years, founded the Young Elites club at 11 years, forming great leadership qualities at a young age.

== Career ==
In 2013, Olusola worked as a research assistant intern with the First Bank of Nigeria Professorial Chair in Computer science focusing mainly on Contributory Indices to Cybecrime in Nigeria.

In 2014, he was appointed as the head of Corporate Citizenship at Microsoft Nigeria, where he initiated social investments and impact oriented programs for the Microsoft within the larger Middle East and Africa group, a position he occupied until June 30, 2019.

In 2018, while still completing his contract at Microsoft, he joined Coven Works and expanded the team's effort to train, consult and recruit technology talents.

In 2019, he finally left Microsoft to join Coven Works full-time. He now lives in Arlington, Texas.

== Education ==
=== University ===
- Obafemi Awolowo University, Ile Ife (2005 - 2006)
- Federal University of Technology Akure (2007–2012)

== Publications ==
- Are you Branded or Stranded? 10th Year Anniversary Edition
