= Rahmon Adedoyin =

Nigerian educationist and businessman

Omoba Rahmon Adedoyin
- Born: Rahmon Adegoke Adedoyin; January 1, 1957 (age 69); Ile-Ife, Osun State, Nigeria
- Education: University of Ife; All Saints University School of Medicine
- Occupations: Educationist; businessman
- Years active: 1990–2023
- Notable work: Oduduwa University; Oduduwa Polytechnic; The Polytechnic, Ile-Ife

Rahmon Adegoke Adedoyin (born January 1, 1957) is a Nigerian educationist and businessman who was sentenced to death by hanging on May 30, 2023. He is the founder and proprietor of Oduduwa University and The Polytechnic, Ile-Ife. In an interview with Vanguard, Rahmon claimed that the late Oba Okunade Sijuwade had nominated him as the Ooni of Ife before his death because of "his developmental strides, particularly in the cradle of Yoruba land".

== Early life, education and career ==
Rahmon Adegoke was born into the royal family of the Akui ruling house in the ancient city of Ife in Osun State, where he went on to complete his primary and secondary school education. He proceeded to the University of Ife (now Obafemi Awolowo University) where he obtained a Bachelor of Science degree in 1983 after studying Mathematics Education. He also claimed he attended Centurion International University, California where he obtained his master's degree and went on to bag a doctorate degree in 1996 from All Saints University School of Medicine, New York City despite the fact that checks shows the universities where he claimed to have obtained both masters and doctorate degrees have not been established as at when he claimed to have attended them. He most probably have only a first degree as he could never had obtained a doctorate degree in 1996 from All Saints University School of Medicine which was established in 2006.

In a bid to revamp education in Nigeria, Rahmon founded The Polytechnic, Ile-Ife in 1984 and Oduduwa University in 2009. He is a fellow of the Nigerian Institute of Industrial Statisticians.

== Death sentence ==
Adedoyin was arrested in November 2021 following the death of Adegoke Timothy at his Hilton Hotel which he is the founder. He was denied bail but granted access to medical facilities of his choice pending court hearing. On 30 May 2023, Court found Rahmon guilty of murder and sentenced him to death by hanging.

In January 2025, the Court of Appeal in Akure upheld the death sentence, ruling that the conviction was valid and in accordance with the law. However, it overturned the lower court's order requiring Adedoyin’s estate to sponsor the victim’s children’s education and reversed the forfeiture of his hotel and vehicle, stating that such orders exceeded statutory provisions.
