= Kingsway International Christian Centre =

Coordinates: 51.57580°N 0.01447°W

KICC
- Kingsway International Christian Centre
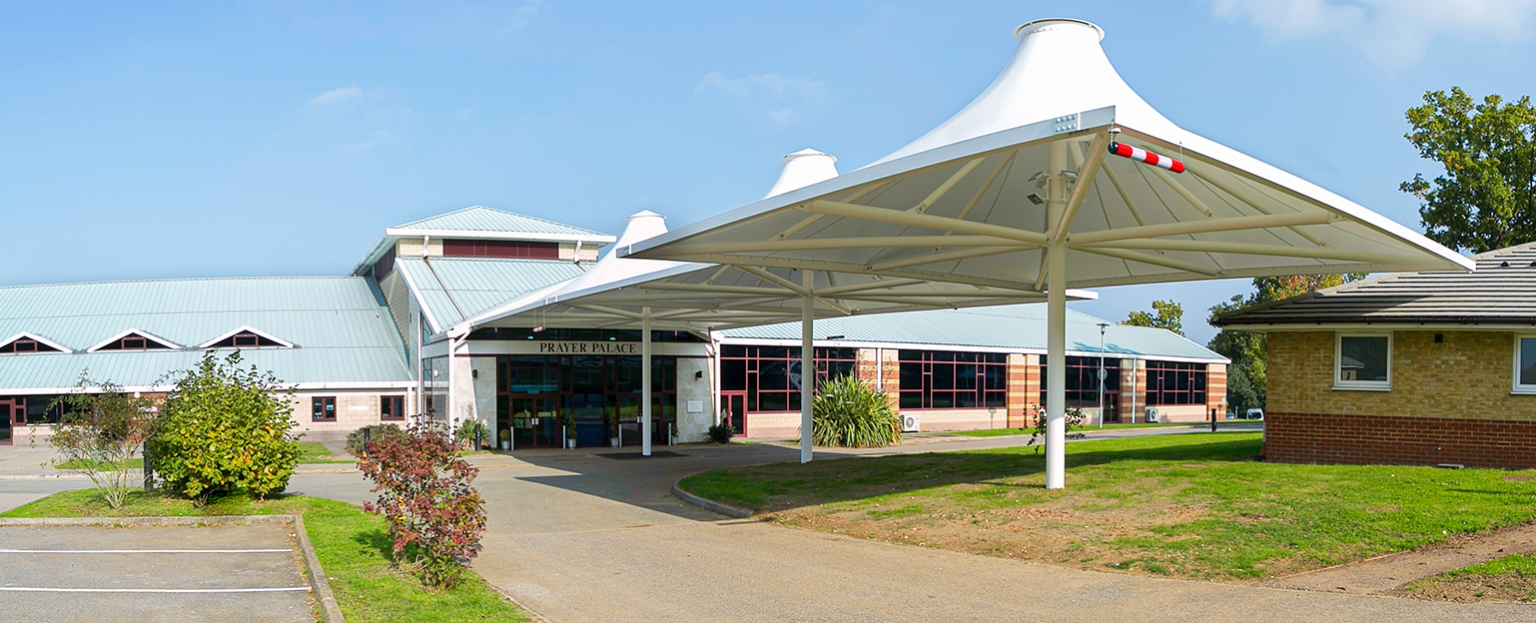
- KICC's current church in Kent, named "Prayer City"
- OS grid reference: TQ 37684 88193
- Location: Maidstone Rd, Chatham ME5 9QG, Kent
- Country: England
- Denomination: Pentecostal
- Website: www.kicc.org.uk

History
- Founded: 1992
- Founder: Matthew Ashimolowo

Kingsway International Christian Centre (KICC) is based in Kent, England and was established in 1992 by Matthew Ashimolowo with 200 adults and 100 children. It currently has up to 12,000 people in attendance at the main church every Sunday. The church is pastored by Matthew Ashimolowo.

== Church history ==
In 1992, Matthew Ashimolowo started Kingsway International Christian Centre at Holloway Boys' School in North London. One year later, they bought a three-storey property which could fit around 1,000 people. In this period, KICC gained a lot of popularity. In 1995, about 3,000 people were members of the church there were now 3 services a day. One year later, KICC started other branches in the South West of London and they also started broadcasting on television. In 1997, four Sunday services were happening at Darnley Road and other services were being held at the Hackney Empire, Hackney Central Hall and York Hall all of them being in Hackney. Their membership numbers were reaching the 4,000s. So they bought 9.5 acres of land of an abandoned warehouse at Waterden Road in Hackney Wick for 2 million pounds. In one year, they made a 4,000 seater hall. It was opened in August 1998 by Dr. Morris Cerullo. For 9 years they owned Waterden Road, which they held their landmark conference, International Gathering of Champions. They also held Winning Women, the women's conference in the church and Watchnight which is an event which marks the start of a new year.

== Relocation history ==
The church, whose majority membership is under 50 years of age, is predominantly of West African origin but claims that worshippers come from 46 nations. It was located for nine years on a 9.5-acre (38,000 m^{2}) site in Hackney, London, close to the site of the 2012 Olympics Village.

KICC had to vacate the site by November 2006 in order to make way for proposed developments for the 2012 London Olympics but did so only in late 2007. The last event held at Waterden Road was the International Gathering of Champions 2007, with many international guest speakers like Bill Winston, Cindy Trimm and Robb Thompson. The church relocated to Hoe Street, Walthamstow, awaiting planning consent and the development of a large new site in Rainham, near the A13. However, the government was reluctant to give the required development planning consent. Eventually the church purchased and moved into its present larger site, Prayer City in Chatham, Kent, while retaining use of the Walthamstow site. In subsequent press releases, KICC announced plans and programmes scheduled for Prayer City from 2013 onwards.

== Charity Commission enquiries ==
Irregularities in the operation of the charity behind Kingsway International Christian Centre (The King's Ministries Trust) has led to it being investigated by the Charity Commission on two occasions.

The first investigation started in 2002 and reported in October 2005. This report concluded that there had been serious misconduct and mismanagement in the administration of the charity. At an early stage in the investigation, it was considered that the charity's assets were at risk, and control was removed from the existing trustees and placed in the hands of an independent external company (the accountancy and management consultancy practice KPMG), who regularised the charity's affairs. The Charity Commission reported that senior pastor Matthew Ashimolowo acted as both a trustee and a paid employee of the charity, in contravention of charity law. He had been responsible for approving payments and benefits to himself and his wife, Yemisi, totalling more than £384,000. Benefits received included free accommodation for himself and family, an £80,000 car, purchase of a timeshare in Florida for £13,000 using a charity credit card, and over half a million pounds paid out to Ashimolowo's private companies, which were operated from church property and had unclear business relationships with the charity. £120,000 was spent celebrating Ashimolowo's birthday. He repaid £200,000 to the charity.

A second statutory investigation into misapplication of funds was reported to have started in February 2011. The charity had received £10m from the London Development Agency for the compulsory purchase of its property in Hackney wanted for the 2012 Olympics. Subsequently, the Commission enquired into £5m given for investment to a former trustee, the former professional footballer Richard Rufus in 2009/10 and 2010/11. Although the trust reported returns from the investment of £1,336,720 in its accounts, the commission's appointed accountant says that there is doubt about whether the charity would get the original £5m back. The Trust has been told it must obtain written permission from the Charity Commission before making any more investments.

The cost of the Charity Commission's running of the first investigation was questioned in the House of Lords by Lord Swinfen during a review of charity law. The three-year-long investigation had cost £1.2 million, chargeable to the charity.

== Crystal Palace ==
KICC bought a site in Crystal Palace that was previously used as a bingo hall, but planning permission to use it as a church has not been granted. They held a business seminar there on 25 August 2012. The intention is to use it for their South West branch based in Wimbledon, London.

KICC originally applied for planning permission to change the planning use class of the building from D2 to D1, in order to allow use for religious ceremonies, on 13 August 2009. This application was refused, on two grounds - that the development would result in the loss of an important leisure venue "harmful to the social, cultural and economic characteristics of the area" and that the wide catchment area for the congregation would attract a large number of cars, resulting in "a significant adverse impact on the surrounding area in terms of parking demand and pedestrian safety". Despite the planning refusal and opposition from a group of local residents campaigning for the building to be converted into a cinema, KICC performed renovation work inside the building to convert its use from a bingo hall. The building subsequently opened in August 2012.

In 2013, over 70 complaints were received by Bromley Council relating to a New Year's Eve event to be held at the venue called "Watchnight". The council issued KICC a notice under section 330 of the Town and Country Planning Act 1990 to determine the format of the event, and officials visited the event on the night. Bromley's head of licensing confirmed that a public entertainments licence was not required due to the religious content of the event. The council determined that the building had also been used for a religious event falling within use class D1 in February 2013. The chief planner of Bromley was of the view that the irregular nature of the religious events did not constitute a material change of use and suggested at a meeting of planning sub-committee number 1 on 6 February 2014 that Bromley continue monitoring the use of the site and request the owners to submit a new planning application for the intended use. A councillor for Crystal Palace complained that KICC "seem to be able to have their cake and eat it" and stated that the council "must demonstrate to owners we will enforce planning law if they choose to breach it. We should reject these recommendations and take enforcement action". The committee subsequently overturned the planner's recommendation by a vote of 5 to 3, instead giving KICC 30 days to submit a new planning application for mixed D2/D1 use or face enforcement action under planning regulations.
