= A122 highway (Nigeria) =

Road in Nigeria

Coordinates: 7.583646°N 4.666185°E

Trunk Road A122

Location
- Country: Nigeria

Highway system
- Transport in Nigeria

The A122 highway is a highway in Nigeria. It is one of the east-west roads linking the main south-north roads. (It is named after the two highways it links).

It runs from the A1 highway at Ibadan, the capital of Oyo State to the A2 highway at Benin City, Edo State. The main towns on the route are Ikire, Gbongan, Ipetumodu, Ilesa, Akure and Owo.
