= Bill Winston =

American televangelist, author, and entrepreneur

- Born: May 6, 1943 (age 83); Tuskegee, Alabama, U.S.
- Occupations: Televangelist, Preacher, Visionary leader and business entrepreneur
- Spouse(s): Veronica Irene Brown, 1983–present
- Children: 3, Melody, Allegra and David, with Brown
- Website: http://www.billwinston.org

William Samuel Winston (born May 6, 1943) is an American televangelist, theology preacher, author, and entrepreneur. He is the founder and Senior Pastor of Living Word Christian Center, a non-denominational church in Forest Park, Illinois, with over 22,000 members.

Winston's teachings, writings, weekly television and radio outreach are circulated through his ministry outreach, Bill Winston Ministries and are aired worldwide via his broadcast program Believer's Walk of Faith. Winston's sermons are also aired on several radio networks within the United States.

== Early life ==
Winston was born and raised in Tuskegee, Alabama, on May 6, 1943. Winston says he was inspired by the Tuskegee airmen and other local aviators.

Winston met his future wife, Veronica Irene Brown, while working at IBM Corporation. They were married in 1983. Veronica Winston is a leader of Living Word Christian Center, teacher, preacher, intercessor and author. The Winstons are the parents of three children: Melody, Allegra and David; and the grandparents of eight.

Winston graduated from Tuskegee Institute in Tuskegee, Alabama, in 1967. After graduation, Winston enlisted in the US Air Force, where he served for six years. During this time, he served as a fighter pilot during the Vietnam War. In March 1971, he piloted an F-4E Phantom that struck anti-aircraft batteries deep within North Vietnamese territory. The mission won him the Distinguished Flying Cross.

In January 1973, Winston joined the IBM Corporation as a Marketer. He was soon promoted to Regional Marketing Manager in IBM's Midwest Region. Winston states that during his time at IBM he became spiritually "born again" and felt a call from God into full-time ministry. He resigned from IBM in 1985 and started attending Logos Bible School. In 1996, Winston briefly attended Oral Roberts University.

== Ministry ==
In 1988, while residing in Minneapolis, Minnesota, Winston and his wife started a small ministry. They traveled to Chicago every weekend to sponsor a two-day Faith Crusades; the attendance was less than 20 people. By December 1988, Winston moved to Chicago with his family. He began a Bible training school, with services held at the Quality Inn Hotel at Madison and Halsted Streets in Chicago. In 1989, it became the “Living Word Church of Chicago.” In 1990 the name changed to “Living Word Christian Center”.

From 1994 through 1997, the church rented space for services at the Chez Roué Banquet Hall in Forest Park, Illinois. Then as the ministry grew the Forest Park Mall, a 33-acre shopping mall, was purchased and the church held its first worship service at the mall on New Year's Eve of 1997. Since then, the church and its worship facility has expanded into a multimillion-dollar, state-of-the-art worship center. The church's auditorium is notable for its forward architectural design.

== Book Publishing ==
Winston has written, authored, and self-published over 15 motivational Christian and Business books, includingTransform Your Thinking, Transform Your Life, Law of Confession, Power of the Tongue' and 'Divine Favor. He has also written mini-books and multimedia resource content. Three of his books have been published by Harrison House.

== Awards and Recognitions ==
- Distinguished Flying Cross Award by the United States Air Force.
- Air Medal Award by the USAF.
- Squadron Top Gun Award by the USAF.
- Distinguished Alumni of Tuskegee University.
- Chicago Tuskegee Club, Incorporated Heritage Award by Tuskegee University.
- Award from the Chicago DoDo chapter of the Tuskegee Airmen.
- Honorary Doctorate degree in Humane Letters from Friends International Christian University, Florida.

== Achievements ==
- Founder of the Joseph Business School and The Joseph Center, a nationally accredited campus and online business school in Forest Park.
- Award nomination at the 28th Annual Stellar Gospel Music Award for Winston and theLiving Word Christian Center church choirfor their first church music album project Bill Winston Presents Living Word: Released in the category of Traditional Choir of the Year.

== Affiliated Ministries ==
- Bill Winston Ministries: Winston is the founder of BWM, a global partnership-based ministry with its headquarters in the United States and offices in South Africa.
- Living Word Christian Center, Forest Park, IL
- Tuskegee Christian Center, Tuskegee, Alabama.
- Faith Ministries Alliance: Winston is the founder of Faith Ministries Alliance which provides a forum for like-minded churches and ministries.
- Bible Training Center: Winston is the founder of the Bible Training Center which provides bible training classes and a ministerial school.
