= Joseph Olugbenga Oloyede =

Nigerian traditional ruler

Oba Joseph Olugbenga Oloyede (Latimogun I) is a tax consultant and the 27th and former Oba of Ipetumodu after he was deposed by the Osun state government upon receipt of the certified true copy of his sentence for fraud owing to his role in a Covid 19 scam in the United States.He was the traditional ruler of Ipetumodu (Apetumodu of Ipetumodu), a town in Ife North Local Government Area of Osun State. He ascended the throne in November 2019, following the demise of Oba James Adedokun Adegoke in November 2017.

== Early life and education ==
Joseph Oloyede attended Christ Church II and C & S Modern Commercial Secondary School for his elementary and secondary education in Ipetumodu. He earned a National Diploma in Accountancy from The Polytechnic, Ibadan, and a Master of Business Administration from Enugu State University of Science and Technology. He later obtained another MBA from the University of Sarasota, Florida, United States. Additionally, he was awarded a Doctor of Business Administration (DBA) from Argosy University, Sarasota.

== Career ==
Oloyede worked with financial institutions such as First Bank of Nigeria and John Holt Financial Merchant Bank before relocating to the U.S., where he continued his career in banking. He later transitioned into academia, teaching at Indiana Wesleyan University and the University of Phoenix where he rose to the rank of a professor.

== Ascendancy ==
Oloyede hails from the Aribile Ruling House of Latimogun Compound, Ipetumodu. He was selected among other candidates by the four-man kingmakers, a process that led to court cases challenging his emergence. However, these disputes were eventually resolved. On October 26, 2019, his selection was ratified by then-Osun State Governor Gboyega Oyetola, marking the beginning of his coronation as the new Apetumodu of Ipetumodu. On November 25, 2022, he was promoted to Deputy Chairman of the Osun State Traditional Council.

== Fraud charges ==
In April 2024, Oba Joseph Olugbenga Oloyede, along with a Nigerian pastor, Edward Oluwasanmi, was accused of perpetrating a $4.2 million COVID-19 fraud. He was arrested and charged with conspiracy to commit wire fraud, among other offenses. On February 18, 2025, the traditional ruler was released by the U.S. District Court for the Northern District of Ohio after authorities seized his travel documents and set his bail at $20,000. On 21 April 2025, the monarch pleaded guilty to the charges.

On 26 August 27, 2025, Joseph Oloyede was sentenced to 56 months in prison by U.S. District Judge Christopher A. Boyko. He will also “serve three years of supervised release after imprisonment” and pay $4,408,543.38 in restitution among others.
