= Odeomu =

Town in Osun State, Nigeria

Ode-Omu is a town in the present Osun State, Nigeria, established in 1909 sequel to implementation of relocation treaty signed between the Ibadan (Oyo) and Ife in 1886. This place is situated in Ayedaade, Osun, Nigeria, its geographical coordinates are 7° 32' 0" North, 4° 24' 0" East and its original name (with diacritics) was Aiyegunle. The settlement was established following civil unrest in neighbouring Yoruba cities of Ife and Modakeke in south-western Nigeria. Most of the families in Ode-Omu have links to Modakeke. Two families, Ijugbe and Ajonbadi led by Dada Ajonbadi and Oke were the first settlers in Ode Omu.

The town is well known to travellers in Nigeria as it is located on one of the main routes to Oshogbo, the state capital. It has also received international fame as the hometown of Late Alh. Abdullatif Akanmu Oladipupo popularly known as Baba Goldsmith (the younger brother of the present king of the land) and of several other Nigerian politicians, business men and religious leaders.

St. David's Anglican Church was the first Church in the town.
