= Karl Toriola =

Chief Executive Officer of MTN Nigeria

Karl Olutokun Toriola is a Nigerian business leader. He is the Chief Executive Officer of MTN Nigeria.

== Background ==
Toriola holds a Bachelor of Science degree in Electronic and Electrical Engineering from Obafemi Awolowo University, Ile-Ife, Nigeria and a Master of Science degree in communication systems from University of Wales, Swansea, UK.

He worked at Ericsson Nigeria in 2000 as Support and Integration Manager and moved to Econet Nigeria in 2003 as Deputy Chief Technical officer rising to become Chief Operations Officer at then Vmobile Nigeria (now Airtel). In 2006 Toriola joined MTN Nigeria as Chief Technical Officer. He was appointed CEO of MTN Congo Brazzaville in 2011 and subsequently, CEO MTN Cameroon in the same year. He went on to become Vice President of MTN Group's WECA (West and Central Africa) for 5 years until he was announced CEO of MTN Nigeria in October 2020.

He is a Fellow of the Nigerian Society of Engineers, a member of the Council for the Regulation of Engineering in Nigeria, and the Institute of Directors. He is on the 12th Governing Council of the Lagos State University, Nigeria.

== Personal life ==
He is a native of Modakeke, a town in Ife East local government area, Osun state, Karl Toriola is a Prince to the current king of Modakeke town in person of Oba Joseph Olubiyi Toriola, also known as the Ogunsua of Modakeke, in his native land he owns many business entity including Cameron Hotel along Ibadan-express way, ile-ife, Osun state. Karl is married and has one child, Damilola Karla Toriola.
