= Asipa =

Town in Osun State, Nigeria

Asipa is a town in Ifẹ North Local Government area, Osun State, Nigeria.

== Etymology ==
The present settlement known as Asipa was said to have derived its name from a corrupt pronunciation of the original meaning “Adipa”, as derived from “Adipa Ogun Olote”. This name was given to Fasina in recognition of his crucial role in helping the then Ooni to defeat the Nupe invaders.

== Government ==
The current ruler of Asipa Land is His Royal Majesty Oba Mufutau Babawale Oyehan Oyekanmi, Ilufemiloye Fasina VIII, Alasipa of Asipa who hails from the Fasina ruling house. He is the son of the late Chief Akintoye Shittu Oyekanmi and Princess Alice Oyeronke Oyekanmi. He became the Alasipa of Asipa on the 25th of November 2018.
