= Matthew Ashimolowo =

Nigerian clergyman (born 1952)

- Born: 17 March 1952 (age 74); Kaduna, Kaduna State, Nigeria
- Title: Founder, Kingsway International Christian Centre (KICC)
- Spouse: Yemisi Ashimolowo (m. 1981)
- Children: 2
- Website: matthewashimolowo.com

Matthew Ashimolowo (born 17 March 1952) is a Nigerian clergyman, the senior pastor of Kingsway International Christian Centre (KICC) in London.

His programme Winning Ways was aired on Trinity Broadcasting Network (TBN UK) (TBN Africa) and on his church owned TV channel "KICC TV"

Ashimolowo founded the Kingsway International Christian Centre (KICC) in 1992 in the UK. Forbes once estimated his fortune at $6 million to $10 million.

== Personal life ==
Ashimolowo converted to Christianity from Islam at the age of 20 after the death of his father before enrolling with a Bible school.

Forbes estimated Ashimolowo's net worth is at between $6–10 million. KICC annual accounts confirmed that he earns an annual salary of £100,000 but the majority of his wealth comes from the sale of Christian literature and documentaries from his media company, Matthew Ashimolowo Media Ministries. Ashimolowo is considered a preacher of the prosperity gospel.

In January 2022, he appointed his first son as resident Pastor of KICC, London and hinted at retirement.

== Financial irregularities ==
The charity behind Kingsway International Christian Centre is The King's Ministries Trust. This was investigated by the Charity Commission of England and Wales between 2002 and 2005. A report of the inquiry was released in October 2005. The report concluded that there had been serious misconduct and mismanagement in the administration of the charity. At an early stage in the investigation, it was considered that the charity's assets were at risk, and control was removed from the existing trustees and placed in the hands of an independent external company (the accountancy and management consultancy practice KPMG), who regularised the charity's affairs.

The report found that:

- there was serious misconduct and mismanagement in the administration of the Charity (section 21)
- he was responsible for approving payments and benefits to himself and his wife, Yemisi, totalling more than £384,000 (section 11)
- he and his family received benefits from the Charity including:
  - free accommodation for himself and family (section 4)
  - an £80,000 car (section 12)
  - he had made personal purchases using the Charity's Visa card, including the purchase of a timeshare apartment in Florida for £13,000 (section 18)
- over half a million pounds was paid out to Ashimolowo's private companies, which were operated from church property and had unclear business relationships with the charity (section 15)
- Ashimolowo acted as both a trustee and a paid employee of the charity (section 4)

He was ordered (section 34) to repay £200,000.

In a subsequent debate in the House of Lords, Lord Swinfen questioned the Charity Commission's running of this investigation. He acknowledged the technical breach, but highlighted its openness, "This unincorporated trust has for some years been remunerating its trustees for various services and doing so quite openly. It made the mistake of not realising that it should have altered its constitution explicitly to allow that to be done." He then questioned the cost of the investigation "With some advice from the commission and the use of the charity lawyer, the trustees of this charity could have affected these changes for some £12,000—one-hundredth of the sum the commission has already spent." He added "The commission believes, understandably, that the future success of this charity is assured by the charity having new trustees".
