= Oduduwa University =

University in Ipetumotu, Osun State, Nigeria

Coordinates: 7°30′04″N 4°27′10″E

- OUI
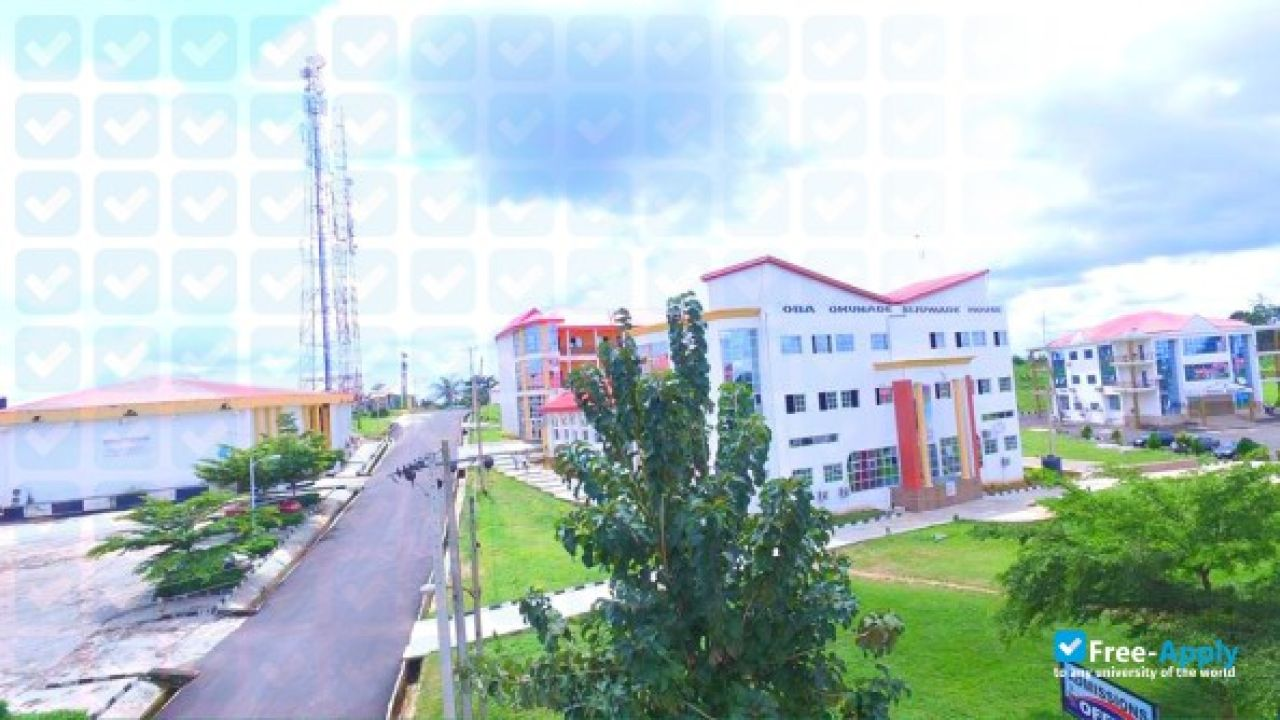
- Oduduwa University
- Motto: Learning for human development
- Type: Private
- Established: 2009
- Chancellor: Dr. Rahmon Adedoyin
- Vice-Chancellor: Prof. Uche Charles Ikechukwu
- Location: Ipetumodu, Osun State, Nigeria
- Campus: Ipetumodu
- Website: http://www.oduduwauniversity.edu.ng/

Oduduwa University is a private higher education institution established in 2009 in Osun State. The university was officially accredited and recognized by the National Universities Commission of Nigeria as a higher education institution. Oduduwa University is located in Ipetumodu, Ile Ife, Osun State, Nigeria. (Note: Multiple sources cited) It was named after Oduduwa, the progenitor of the Yoruba people.

== Colleges ==
The university is made up of four colleges:

=== College of Management and Social Sciences (CMSS) ===
College of Management and Social Sciences (CMSS) consists of eight departments with only bachelor's degree programs running.

- Business Administration
- Mass Communication & Media Technology
- Economics
- Banking & Finance
- Accounting
- Public Administration
- Political Science
- International Relations

=== College of Natural and Applied Sciences (CNAS) ===
- Mathematics and Statistics
- Computer Science
- Physics (Electronics)
- Chemical Sciences (Industrial Chemistry, Chemistry, and Biochemistry)
- Biological Sciences (Microbiology/Pre-medicine)

=== College of Environmental Design and Management (CEDM) ===
College of Environmental Design and Management (CEDM) which consists of three departments, but undergraduate programs

- Architecture
- Estate Management
- Quantity Surveying

=== College of Engineering and Technology (CET) ===
- Computer Engineering
- Electronic/Electrical Engineering
- Mechanical Engineering

== Centres ==
The following centres that complement academic and research activities:

- Centre for Information and Communications Technology (CICT)
- Centre for Entrepreneurial and Vocational Training (CEV)
- Centre for Professional Studies (CPS)
- Centre for Cultural Studies (CCS)
- Centre for Foundation and Extra-moral Studies (CFES)
- Centre for International Studies/Exchange Programmes
- Centre for Communication and Leadership Training (CCL)

All undergraduate students of the university go through the Centre of Information and Communication Technology and Centre of Entrepreneurial and Vocational Training

== Library ==
Oduduwa university has a library that is situated in the school premises. The library is headed by the university librarian. The aims and objectives of the library is to gather the most up-to-date print and electronic resources to support the university's learning, teaching, and research activities; to share pertinent information with clients; to assist the university in developing its human and non-human resources; and to collaborate with other university libraries in resource sharing through interlibrary lending, photocopying, and courier services..One of the services provided by the Oduduwa University Electronic Library is Education for Colleges and Universities. They offer answers for a range of business and organization education requirements.
