= Modakeke =

Town in Osun State, South West Nigeria

Modakeke is a town near Ile-Ife in Osun State, South West Nigeria, with a population of about 120,000 people. The Modakekes are also known as the "Akoraye" and have a history of valor at war and are prosperous farmers. A community beside Ile-Ife, Modakeke is located in the tropical forest of South West Nigeria. It is about 45 kilometres from Osogbo, the capital of Osun State capital and 90 kilometres from Ibadan, the capital of Oyo. A major celebration in Modakeke, is known as Akoraye Day, celebrated in December.

== History ==
The founding of Modakeke is intimately and closely linked to and intertwined with the internecine wars that ravaged Yorubaland in the 19th century. The wars saw the collapse of the old Oyo Empire, and establishment of new settlements across Yorubaland in this period and time. Modakeke was thus established on a virgin land in 1845. The name, Modakeke, was not just a conjecture; it was derived from the chirpings of a nest of storks around the site of the new settlement. The appellation, Akoraye, is a contraction of “Ako ri aaye” (Storks find ample space). The name of the area, Iraye, is a derivative of this appellation. According to J.F. Ade Ajayi and Robert Smith in Yoruba Warfare in the 19th Century: Oba Abewela created a separate township as Modakeke just outside Ile-Ife for the unassimilated settlers. All historical accounts therefore confirm that the land was given to the Oyos: there were no strings attached, it was a direct allocation by Ooni Abewela for strategic reasons. Ooni Abewela allocated to the Oyos (Modakekes) a settlement outside the walls of Ife deputing one Adegboro to accompany Oyos to the site and mark out the settlement. On the Oyo leader, he conferred the title of 'Ogunsuwa' signifying one whom Ogun (the god of war) has blessed with fortune. That has become the Title of all rulers of Modakeke to this day. (The History of Yorubas, by Rev. Samuel Johnson (pg. 231). Before the 1959, Chieftaincy Declaration, Ogunsuwa of Modakeke was one of the recognized communities as one of the chiefs appointed to the then Western Region House of Chiefs. Ogunsuwa Awotobi was appointed in 1954. Hierarchically in Ifeland, the Ogunsuwa of Modakeke was number three (No 3), ranking after Ooni of Ife and Apetumodu of Ipetumodu (we refer to Circular No. C.63/12 dated 23 October 1946, issued by the Divisional Office, Ife, Nigeria).

Modakeke, from its founding in 1845, grew rapidly as more war displaced Oyos poured into the new settlement. Its people did not waste time before they fanned into the forests, tilling the soil and recording bounteous harvest. The absence of government attention predicated Modakeke's struggle for self development.

Ooni of Ife, Oba Akinmoyero was said to have received them well. They started growing and producing different types of food crops on farmlands given to them by their hosts. A good number of them got recruited into Ife’s army and it was through their gallantry that Ife had its territory extended to Alakowe, its present boundary with Ijesa land.

Prior to the arrival of the Oyos, Ijeshaland extended to the present location of the Palace of the Ooni of Ife. This is why the Palace area is known as Enuwa (Enu Owa) until today.

Ooni Akinmoyero gave the Oyos an expanse of land to stay within Ile Ife, the place given to the Modakekes was home to a species of bird called Ako (Stork), Hence the origin of the appellation Akoraye (the stork found a space). It was also customary for the storks at the location to chirp and sing the rhyme "Mo-da-ke-ke-ke-ke" which was most of the time heard by the Ifes and it was decided that the new settlement would be called Modakeke.

Modakeke men are usually known as disciplined and highly trained warriors.

Oriki of Modakeke

"sa abada ni elu fun, Modakeke lo ti wa; sa abada, sa abada, sa abada, sa bada; sa abada ni elu fun, Modakeke lo to wa."

It is played with a drum called "bembe."

== Notable people ==
- Oba Francis Olagobin Olatunji Adedoyin
- Olusola Amusan
- Dele Olojede
- Festus Onigbinde
- Karl Toriola
