= Chaim Kreiswirth =

Orthodox rabbi (1918–2001)

Rabbi Chaim Kreiswirth

Chief Rabbi of Machzikei Hadass, Antwerp

Founder and Rosh Yeshiva of Mercaz HaTorah Yeshiva, Jerusalem

Personal life
- Born: 1918 Wojnicz, Poland
- Died: 30 December 2001 (aged 82–83) Jerusalem, Israel
- Parent: Rabbi Avrohom Yosef Schermann
- Known for: Chief Rabbi of Machzikei Hadass, Antwerp; Founder of Mercaz HaTorah Yeshiva
- Occupation: Rabbi, Rosh Yeshiva

Religious life
- Religion: Judaism
- Denomination: Orthodox

Rabbi Chaim Kreiswirth (1918–2001) was an Orthodox rabbi who served as the longtime Chief Rabbi of Congregation Machzikei Hadass Antwerp, Belgium. He was the founder and rosh yeshiva of the Mercaz HaTorah yeshiva in Jerusalem, and was a highly regarded Torah scholar.

== Early years ==
Kreiswirth was born in Wojnicz, Poland in 1918, the son of Rabbi Avrohom Yosef Schermann and Perla Kreiswirth.

Kreiswirth studied for many years in Poland and Lithuania including the Chachmei Lublin Yeshiva. Rabbis Chaim Ozer Grodzinski and Chanoch Henoch Eigis warmly recommended his manuscript on Tractate Zevachim, which was lost during the Holocaust.

Kreiswirth received Semicha from Chanoch Henich Eigess.

== Second World War ==
With the 1939 German invasion of Poland, Kreiswirth fled to Lithuania.

In Lithuania, he married Sarah, the daughter of the mashgiach of Slabodka, Rabbi Avraham Grodzinski. Sarah was a niece of the venerable Rabbi Yaakov Kamenetsky. The couple then left via Vilna for Palestine, where he met rabbis including the Brisker Rav, the Chazon Ish, the Steipler, Shlomo Zalman Auerbach and Yosef Shalom Elyashiv.

== Post-World War II ==
At the end of World War II, Kreiswirth returned to Poland in an attempt to rescue Jewish children who had been sheltered by the Catholic Church for the war's duration.

In 1947, he moved to the United States and from 1947 to 1953 served as Rosh Yeshiva at the Hebrew Theological College in Chicago, Illinois.

In 1953 he moved to Antwerp in an effort to rebuild the Jewish community there. This move was based on the counsel of the Chazon Ish, and the Amshinover Rebbe.

Kreiswirth became the Av Beth Din and Posek in Antwerp and was active in Agudath Israel.

== Death ==
Kreiswirth died on Sunday 30 December 2001 (16 Tevet 5762 on the Hebrew calendar) shortly before midnight, aged 82, after suffering from an illness. He is buried on Har HaMenuchot.

Thousands of people came from all over Europe to participate in the funeral in Antwerp. Among the eulogizers were Dayan (rabbinic judge)Yitzchok Tuvia Weiss and Dayan Elya Sternbuch. Thereafter, the main funeral and burial were held in Jerusalem, where Nosson Tzvi Finkel and others gave eulogies.

== Legacy ==
In 2015, Rabbis Dov Kreiswirth (Chaim Kreiswirth's son) and Zvi Twersky established Yeshivas Toras Chaim in the Romema neighborhood of Jerusalem in Kreiswirth's name.
