= Enoch (disambiguation) =

Enoch is a biblical figure and the subject of the Book of Enoch.

Enoch may also refer to:

== People ==
- Enoch (given name)
- Enoch (surname)
- Enoch (son of Cain)
- Enoch or Hanok, one of the five sons of Midian
- Teneu, also known as St. Enoch

== Places ==
=== Canada ===
- Enoch, Alberta, postal address of Enoch Cree Nation 135

=== United States ===
- Enoch, Kentucky
- Enoch, Utah
- Enoch, West Virginia
- Enoch Lake, a small community near Lake Park, Georgia
- Enoch, Texas, an unincorporated community in Upshur County, Texas

== Entertainment ==
- "Enoch", a short story from the Pleasant Dreams: Nightmares by Robert Bloch
- Enoch, a band later renamed P.O.D. (Payable on Death)
- Enoch, a fictional city of vampires in World of Darkness
- Captain Enoch, a "Night Trooper" variant stormtrooper that appears in the Star Wars limited series Ahsoka

== Technology ==
- Enoch, a chatbot operated by conspiracy website Natural News
- Enoch Linux, an early name for Gentoo Linux

== See also ==
- Book of Enoch (disambiguation)
- Enochian (disambiguation)
- Enoc (disambiguation)
- Enock, a given name and surname
- Chanoch (disambiguation)
- Hanoch (disambiguation)
- Henoch (disambiguation)
