= Chanoch =

Chanoch is a Hebrew-language masculine given. It may refer to:

- Chanoch Henoch Bornsztain (died 1965), Polish-born rabbi
- Chanoch Henoch Eigis (1863–1941), Lithuanian rabbi
- Chanoch Ehrentreu (born 1932), German-born rabbi
- Chanoch Nissany (born 1963), Israeli-born Hungarian racing driver
- Chanoch Dov Padwa (1908–2000), Galicia-born rabbi

== See also ==
- Enoch (given name)
- Hanoch
- Henoch
