= Enoc =

Enoc or ENOC may refer to:

- ENOC, Emirates National Oil Company
- European Network of Ombudspersons for Children (abbreviated ENOC)
- Saint Issel, the father of Saint Teilo whose name is also given as Enoc
- Enoc Huws, 1891 Welsh novel by Daniel Owen
- EnerNOC, American utilities company, NASDAQ code ENOC
- ENOC (album), a 2020 album by Ozuna

== See also ==
- Enock, a given name and surname
- Enoch (disambiguation)
