= Enoch (surname) =

Enoch is a surname. Notable people with the surname include:

- Alfred Enoch (born 1988), English actor
- Craig T. Enoch (born 1950), American lawyer and judge
- David Enoch (1901–1949), Israeli chess player
- David Enoch (philosopher) (born 1971), Israeli philosopher
- Don Enoch (1916–2010), American politician
- Leeanne Enoch, Australian politician
- Samuel Enoch (1814–1876), German rabbi
- Suzanne Enoch (born 1964), American writer
- Suzy Enoch, Scottish writer and actress
- Wesley Enoch (born 1969), Australian playwright

== See also ==
- Enock, a surname and given name
