= Enock =

Enock is both a masculine given name and a surname. The bearers of the given name are often of African descent. Notable people with the name include:

== Surname ==
- Fred Enock (1845–1916), English microscopist, illustrator and naturalist
- Michel Enock (1947–2025), French mathematician
- Nkulanga Enock (born 1990), Ugandan development practitioner and activist
- Paul Enock (1934–2013), Canadian speed skater

== Given name ==
- Enock Agyei (born 2005), Belgian footballer
- Enock Atta Agyei (born 1999), Ghanaian footballer
- Enock Asubonteng (born 2000), Ghanaian footballer
- Enock Chama, Zambian boxer
- Enock Glidden, American disabled athlete and professional adventurer
- Enock Koech (born 1981), Kenyan long-distance runner
- Enock Kwakwa (born 1994), Ghanaian footballer
- Enock Kwateng (born 1997), French footballer
- Moven Enock Mahachi (1948–2001), Zimbabwean politician, Minister of Defence
- Enock Maki (born 1989), Papua New Guinean rugby league footballer
- Enock Makonzo (born 1997), Canadian football linebacker of Congolese descent
- Mandlenkosi Enock Mbili (1963–2012), South African politician
- Enock Musonda (born 1966), Zambian sprinter
- Enock Mwepu (born 1998), Zambian former footballer
- Enock Nyongore (born 1973), Ugandan politician
- Enock Ondego (1930–2023), Kenyan musician, songwriter, singer, and author
- Enock Otoo (born 2004), Ghanaian footballer
- Enock Sabumukama (born 1995), Burundian footballer
- Carl-Enock Svensson (1895–1986), Swedish pentathlete
- Enock Tombe Stephen (born 1952), South Sudanese Anglican bishop
- Enock Hill Turnock (1857–1926), American architect
- Enock Walusimbi (born 1998), Ugandan footballer
- Enock Wanyama (born 2001), Kenyan footballer

== See also ==
- Enoch (disambiguation)
