= Hanoch =

Hanoch is a Hebrew given name and surname. It may refer to:

== Given name ==
- Hanoch, the son of Reuben and head of the Hanochite branch of the tribe of Reuben (Numbers 26:5)
- Hanoch Albeck (1890–1972), Israeli professor
- Hanoch Bartov (1926–2016), Israeli author
- Hanoch Gutfreund, Israeli Andre Aisenstadt Chair in theoretical physics, and former President, of the Hebrew University of Jerusalem
- Hanoch Hecht, American rabbi
- Hanoch Levin (1943–1999), Israeli dramatist
- Hanoch Piven (born 1963), Israeli illustrator
- Hanoch Teller (born 1956), Austrian-American author
- Moses ben Hanoch (died 965), medieval Babylonian-born Spanish rabbi
- Hanoch bar Ya'akov Kafka, Hebrew name of Franz Kafka's father

== Surname ==
- Shalom Hanoch (born 1946), Israeli musician

== See also ==
- Enoch (disambiguation)
- Henoch (disambiguation)
- Hanok, a traditional Korean house
- Hanochi
