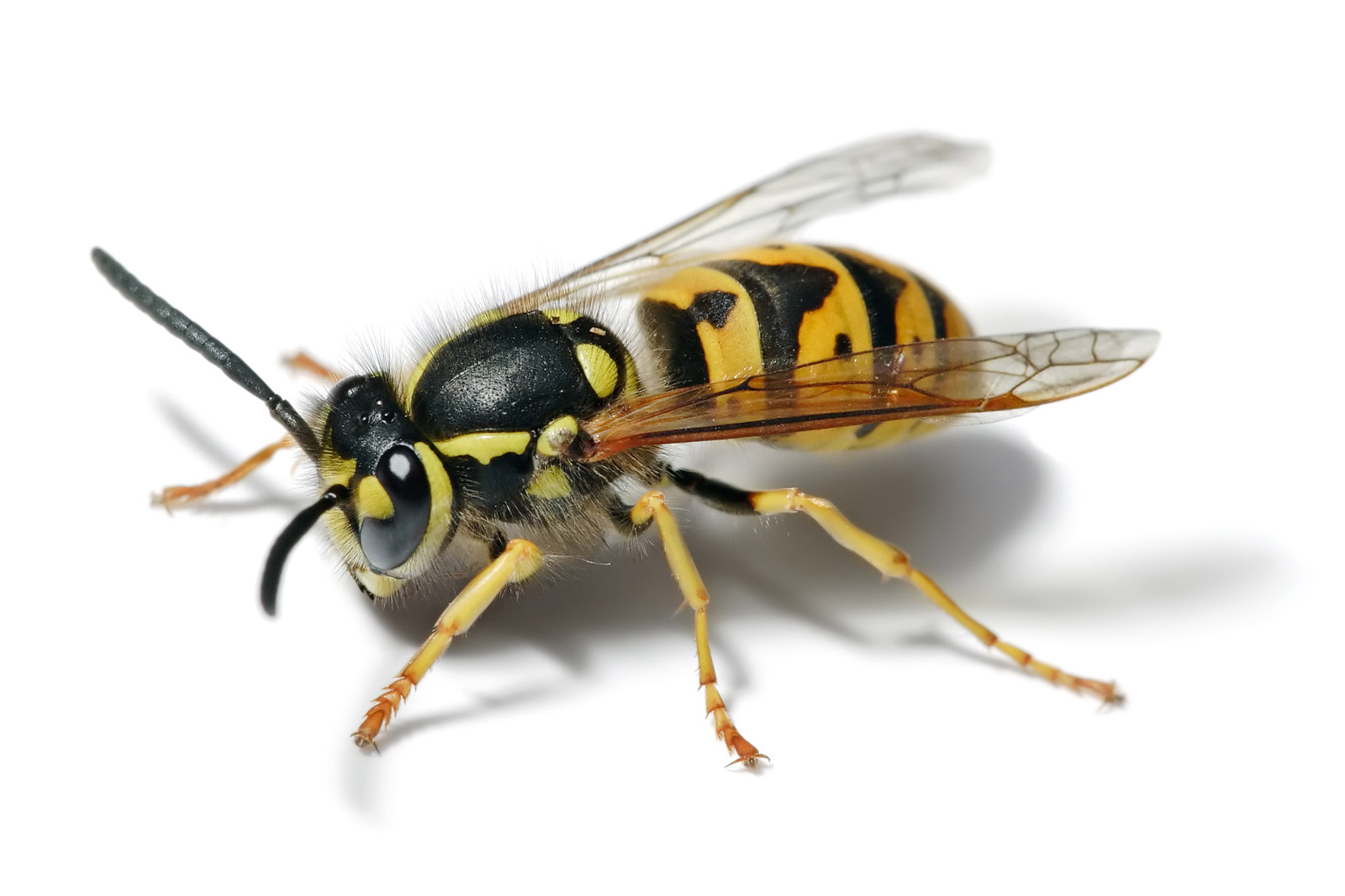
- Near Swifts Creek, Victoria, Australia

Scientific classification
- Kingdom: Animalia
- Phylum: Arthropoda
- Clade: Pancrustacea
- Class: Insecta
- Order: Hymenoptera
- Family: Vespidae
- Genus: Vespula
- Species: V. germanica

Binomial name
- Vespula germanica (Fabricius, 1793)
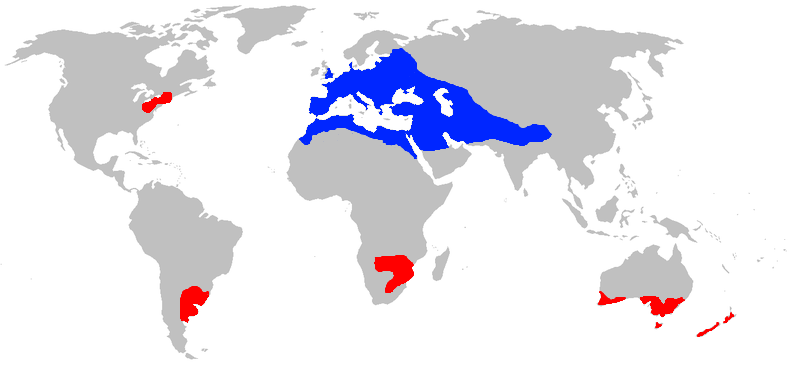
- Distribution map of European wasp blue : native, red : introduced

= Vespula germanica =

German wasp

Species of wasp

Vespula germanica, known colloquially as the European wasp, German wasp, or German yellowjacket, is a species of wasp found in much of the Northern Hemisphere, native to Europe, Northern Africa, and temperate Asia. It has spread and become well-established in many other places, including North America, South America (Argentina and Chile), Australia, South Africa, and New Zealand. German wasps are part of the family Vespidae and are sometimes mistakenly referred to as paper wasps because they build grey paper nests, although strictly speaking, paper wasps are part of the subfamily Polistinae. In North America, they are also known as yellowjackets.

== Taxonomy and phylogeny ==
Vespula germanica belongs to the genus Vespula, which includes various species of social wasps that are found throughout the Northern Hemisphere. In North America, these wasps are most commonly known as yellowjackets, but this name also applies to species within the sister genus Dolichovespula. Members of Vespula are often confused with other genera, especially the paper wasp Polistes dominula. Colonies of V. germanica share many characteristics with those of V. vulgaris (common wasp) and V. pensylvanica (western yellowjacket), so they are very often studied together.

== Description and identification ==
Difference between Vespula vulgaris and Vespula germanica

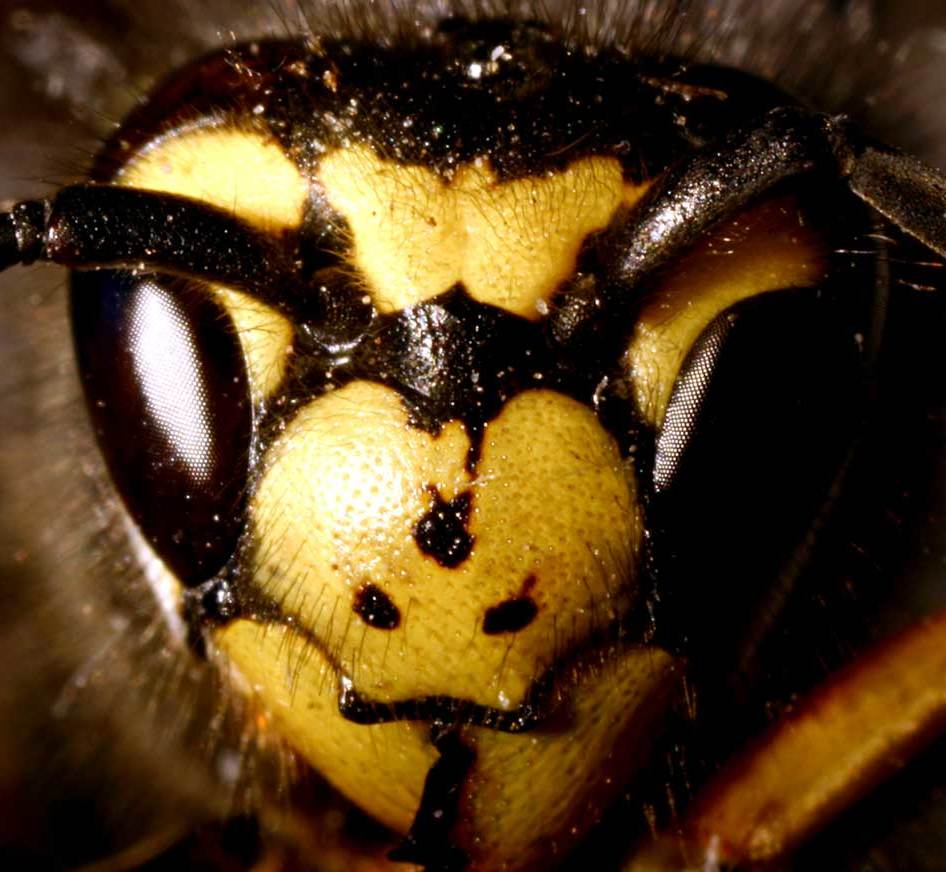
The three dots on the face of the German wasp.

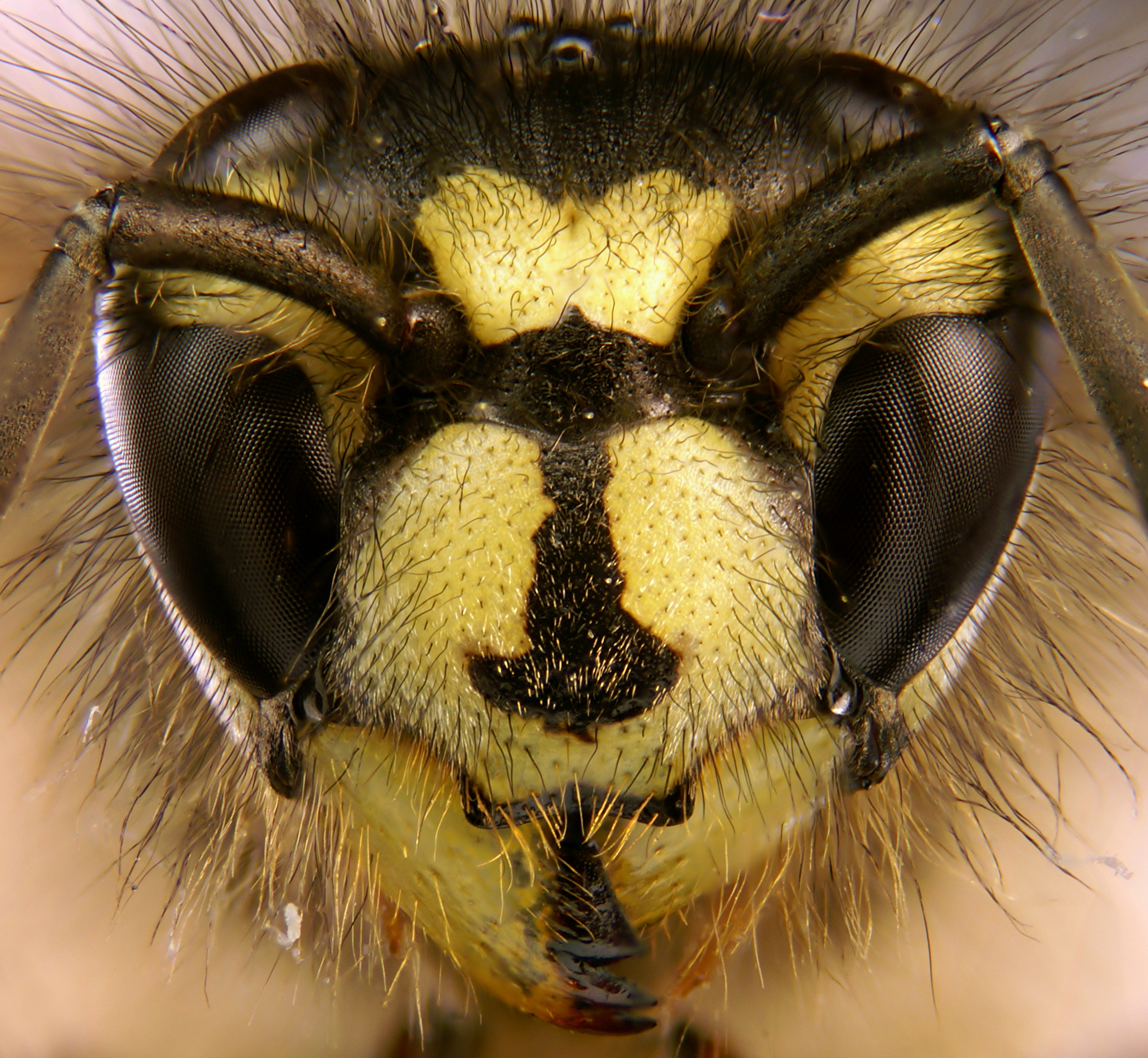
The face of the common wasp worker does not have distinct dots.

The German wasp is about 13 mm (0.5 in) long, has a mass of 74.1 ± 9.6 mg, and has typical wasp colours of black and yellow. It is very similar to the common wasp (V. vulgaris), but unlike the common wasp, has three tiny black dots on the clypeus. To further complicate the issue this only applies to workers. To help with identification, a good practice to observe is to first categorize the wasp as worker, queen, or male before identifying it as V. vulgaris or V. germanica. Gastral pattern (the black dots or marks on the abdomen) are highly variable and not good characteristics to use in identifying. However, the identification of a wasp as V. vulgaris may be difficult because the normally unbroken black mark on its clypeus can sometimes appear broken (particularly in males) making it look extremely similar to V. germanica.

== Distribution and habitat ==
V. germanica originated in Europe, Asia, and North Africa and can now be found in sections of every continent but Antarctica. It has established populations in North America, South America, South Africa, New Zealand, and Australia. The species has been described as an invasive species. German yellowjackets are known to be especially successful and destructive invaders of new territories. These wasps are polyphagous predators which feed on native arthropods, and because they are able to outdo many other animals for food, they have caused considerable harm to the indigenous wildlife of areas which they have invaded. For a given year, V. germanica disperses at distances of no more than 1000 m, (1 km) so that their rapid dispersal is likely to be aided by accidental human transport of hibernating queens. This normally leads to a bottleneck effect during the establishment of new populations, which explains the significant genetic differentiation often found among geographically distant populations.

The nest is made from chewed plant fibres, mixed with saliva. The majority of nests are found in the soil below ground. A significant portion of nests are found in artificial structures such as attics, and a small portion are found above ground.

== Colony cycle ==
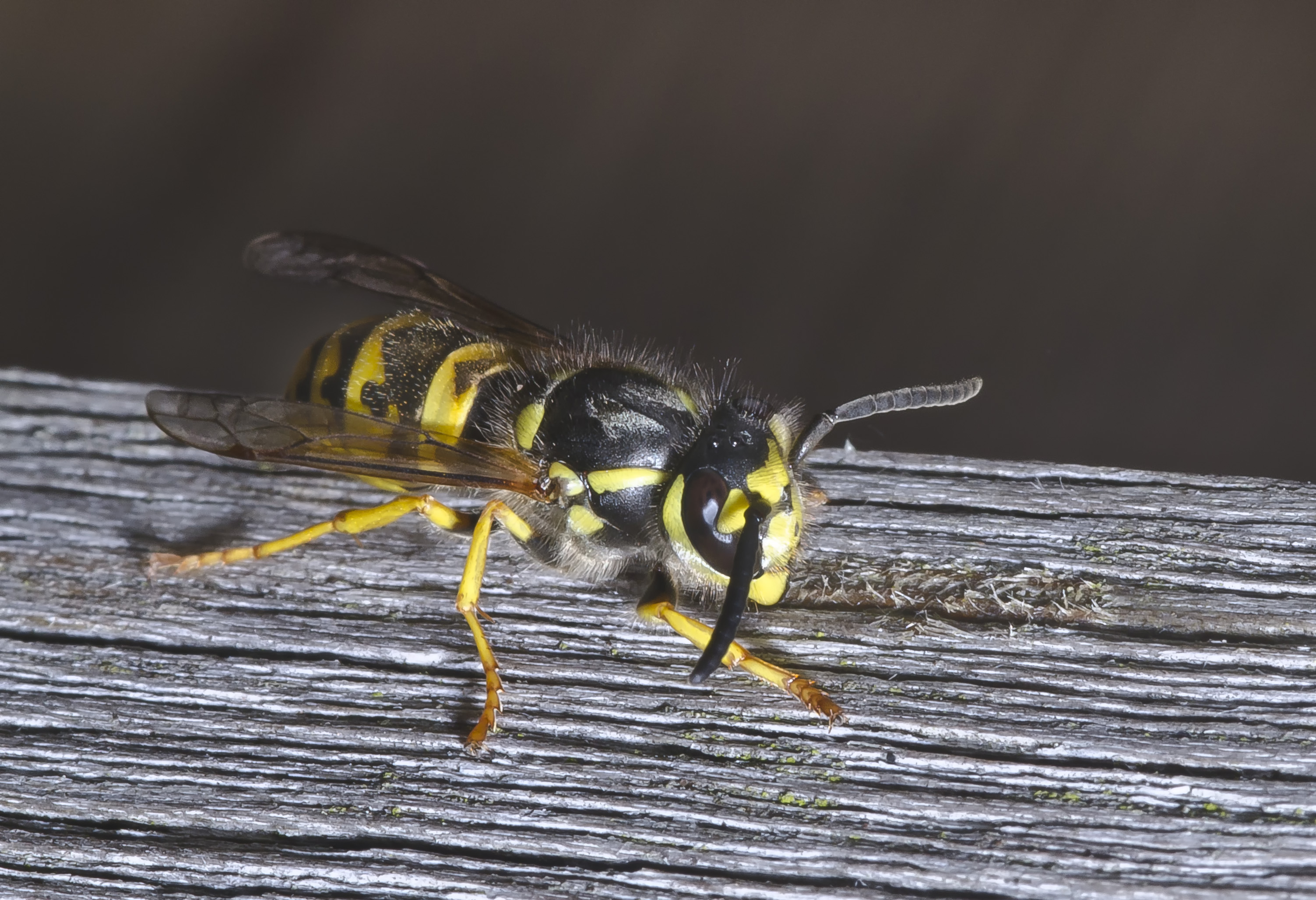
German wasp rasping wood with which to build its nest

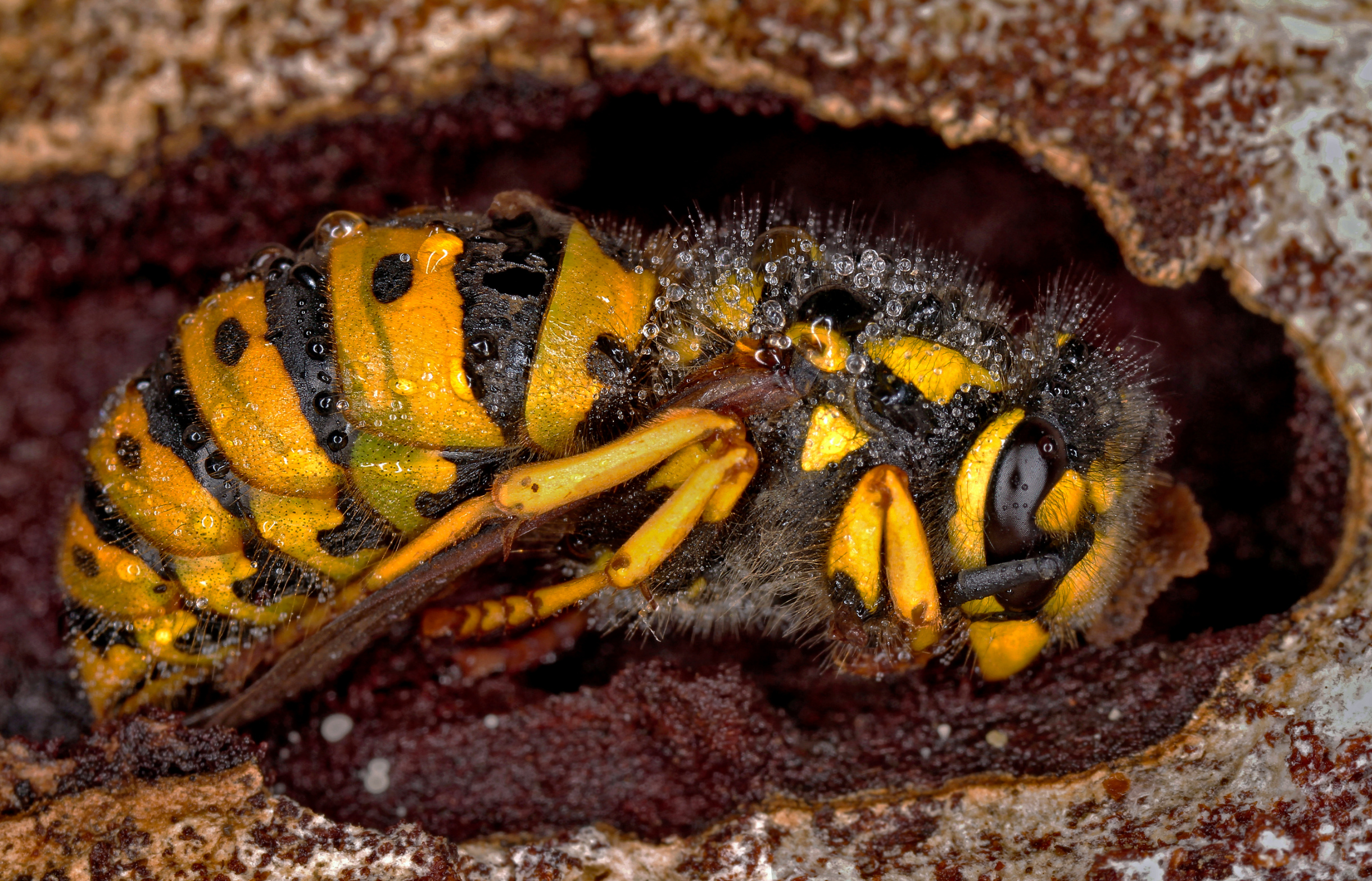
Macrophotography of queen of V. germanica in hibernation, awaiting spring to establish a new insect colony

A single queen initiates a nest in the spring by constructing an embryonic nest, which contains a series of hexagonal cells. These cells are used to house one wasp through the immature stages of life: egg, larval instar, and pupa. The colony grows rapidly during the summer with a huge increase in worker numbers and nest size. By the end of summer, the rate of growth slows considerably and more males are produced than workers, and the focus is shifted from building small cells to building cells that are 30-40 percent larger. These new cells house the new queens and males. In the fall, the new queens begin hibernation, while the old queens die off and the colony collapses. In some cases, the nests may survive through the winter and reach the next season. If this occurs, the nest will become polygynous and reach a much larger size than in the previous year.

V. germanica nests are strongly affected by climate. Average colonies in Australia contain over 9500 small workers and 3600 large queen and male cells. By the end of May, colonies in Australia have 15,000 wasps emerging from small cells and 2500 wasps emerging from the large cells. By comparison, nests in the British Isles only have 6100–6500 small cells and 1500 large cells on average, in roughly eight combs. Additionally, a significant number of nests in Australia are able to survive the winter, whereas in England none of the nests survive. This demonstrates how V. germanica nests can reach a substantial size in appropriate climate conditions.

== Behavior ==
=== Worker specialization ===
High variation in the sequence and diversity of tasks performed by V. germanica workers suggests limited temporal polyethism exists within the species. Temporal polyethism is a mechanism in which workers specialize on tasks in a sequential order throughout their lives, instead of performing numerous tasks concurrently. The typical order of tasks in V. germanica is nest work, pulp foraging, carbohydrate foraging and protein foraging. Approximately 61 percent of the wasps observed perform more than two of these tasks during their lifetimes. Additionally, about 40 percent of the wasps specialize on only one task per day, but these individuals varied with respect to age and sequence of task performance. The schedule of temporal polyethism found in V. germanica is highly accelerated when compared to other Hymenoptera, which is likely related to worker lifespan. Vespula workers may not live long enough to benefit from a strict system of worker specialization, in which workers repeatedly perform one task.

=== Mating behavior ===
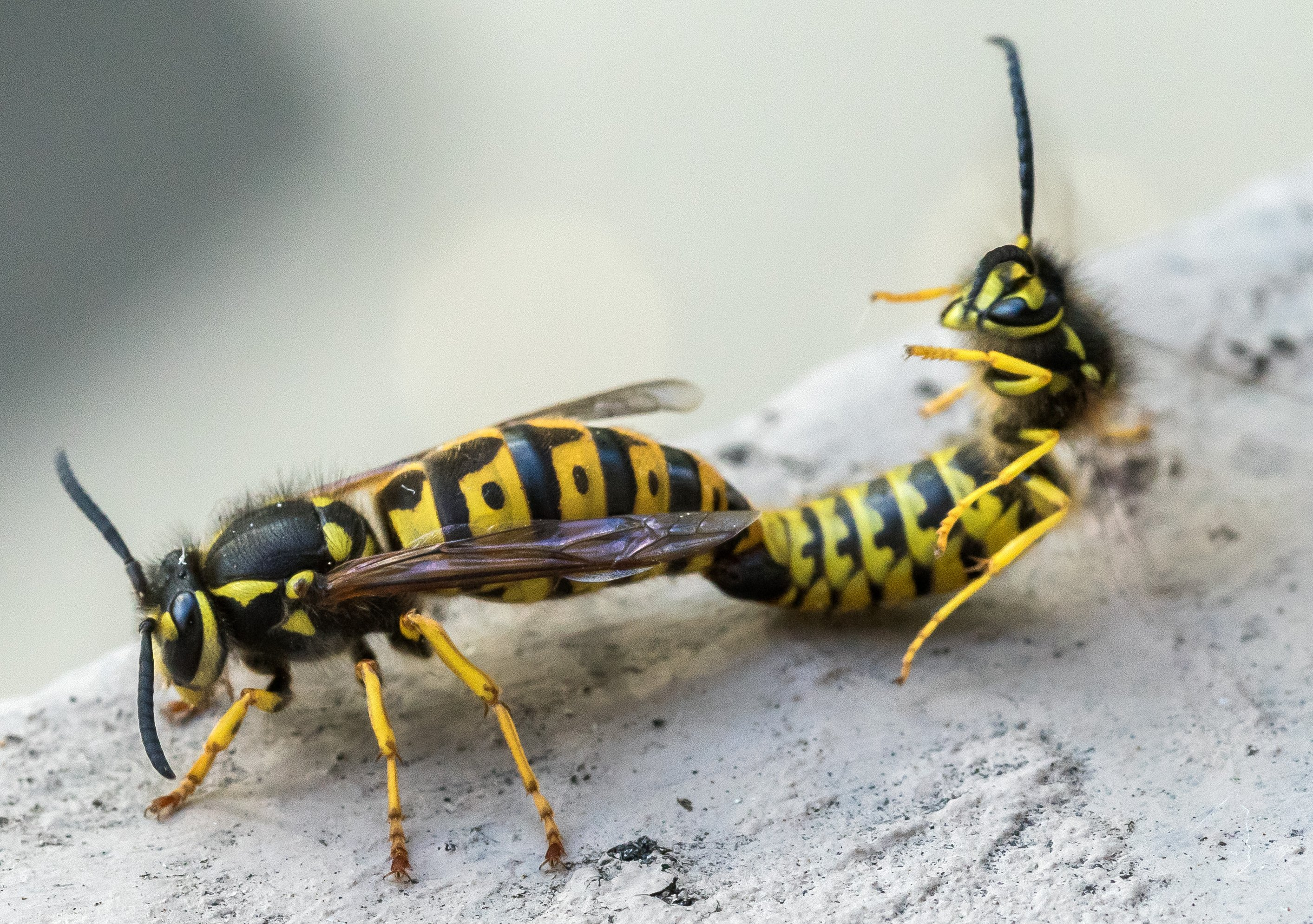
Queen V. germanica and male mating

Vespula germanica queens are typically polyandrous. The queens mate with a moderate number of males, usually between one and seven, with no optimal number of mates. In addition, mating events are independent of each other, which discredits the hypothesis that queens terminate mating behavior after mating with a male that possesses an optimal set of attributes.

V. germanica workers are unable to mate and so incapable of producing diploid offspring. In some nests, however, the workers produce haploid male offspring from unfertilized eggs. Worker reproduction has been documented in other Vespula wasp colonies, but usually only after the death of the queen. However, workers of V. germanica have been found reproducing in the presence of a queen.

=== Foraging behavior ===
Vespula germanica workers are known to be opportunistic predators and scavengers. They are efficient at hunting for small, live food sources and at collecting from large stationary sources. It is believed that the flexibility in V. germanica's foraging behavior is a key factor in their ability to rapidly colonize new areas in a variety of ecological environments. As scavengers, V. germanica are forced to make numerous trips between the location of the food source and the nest, where the larvae are kept and fed. This calls for V. germanica foragers to be adept at relocating earlier food sources.

=== Cognitive plasticity ===
The ability to relocate previously discovered food sources is only one example of the diverse cognitive mechanisms at play within V. germanica's behaviors. V. germanica foragers continue to visit a feeder after food removal, but are able to rapidly remove associations that no longer provide a reward. The amount of time that the foragers continue to search these sites depends on the number of times they had visited it in the past. The choices made by V. germanica take into account both current and past experiences. These abilities imply that these wasps have important learning and memory capacities which enable them to memorize various resource characteristics, including the route to resources, as well as specific spatial location with respect to local landmarks. In addition, V. germanica wasps have been shown to have sensorimotor learning capacities which allow them to associate visual stimuli with certain motor responses. This reported high cognitive plasticity enables V. germanica wasps to inhabit a variety of regions. Its flexibility in nesting and diet habits in conjunction with its foraging capabilities may help explain the success with which V. germanica has invaded so many different ecological areas.

== Kin selection ==
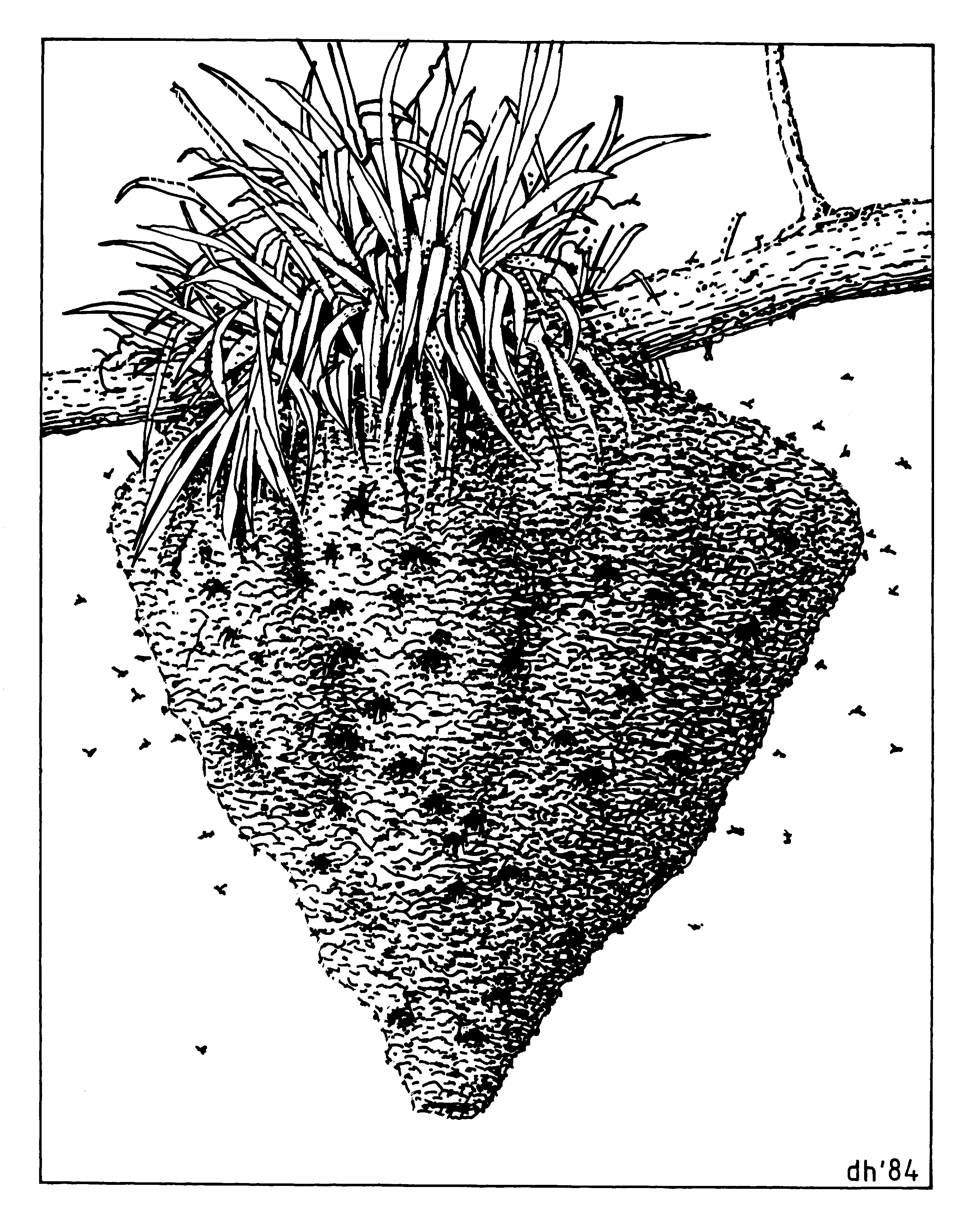
Vespula germanica nest (illustration by Des Helmore)

=== Genetic relatedness within colonies ===
V. germanica queens are typically polyandrous. Because the queen mates with multiple males, the workers are more closely related to the queen's sons than to sons of other workers. These asymmetries in relatedness are believed to be a factor leading to worker policing within colonies.

=== Male skew ===
Male reproductive skew within V. germanica indicates that males do not contribute equally to the production of offspring when compared to females. The level of skew observed was higher among males in nests with queens that mated with multiple males. Reproductive skew may be linked to patterns of sex allocation, but sex ratio data for Vespula colonies suggest that a split-sex ratio is not produced. This contradicts the theory that the reproductive skew seen in V. germanica is part of an evolutionary strategy of males due to asymmetries in relatedness.

=== Worker policing ===
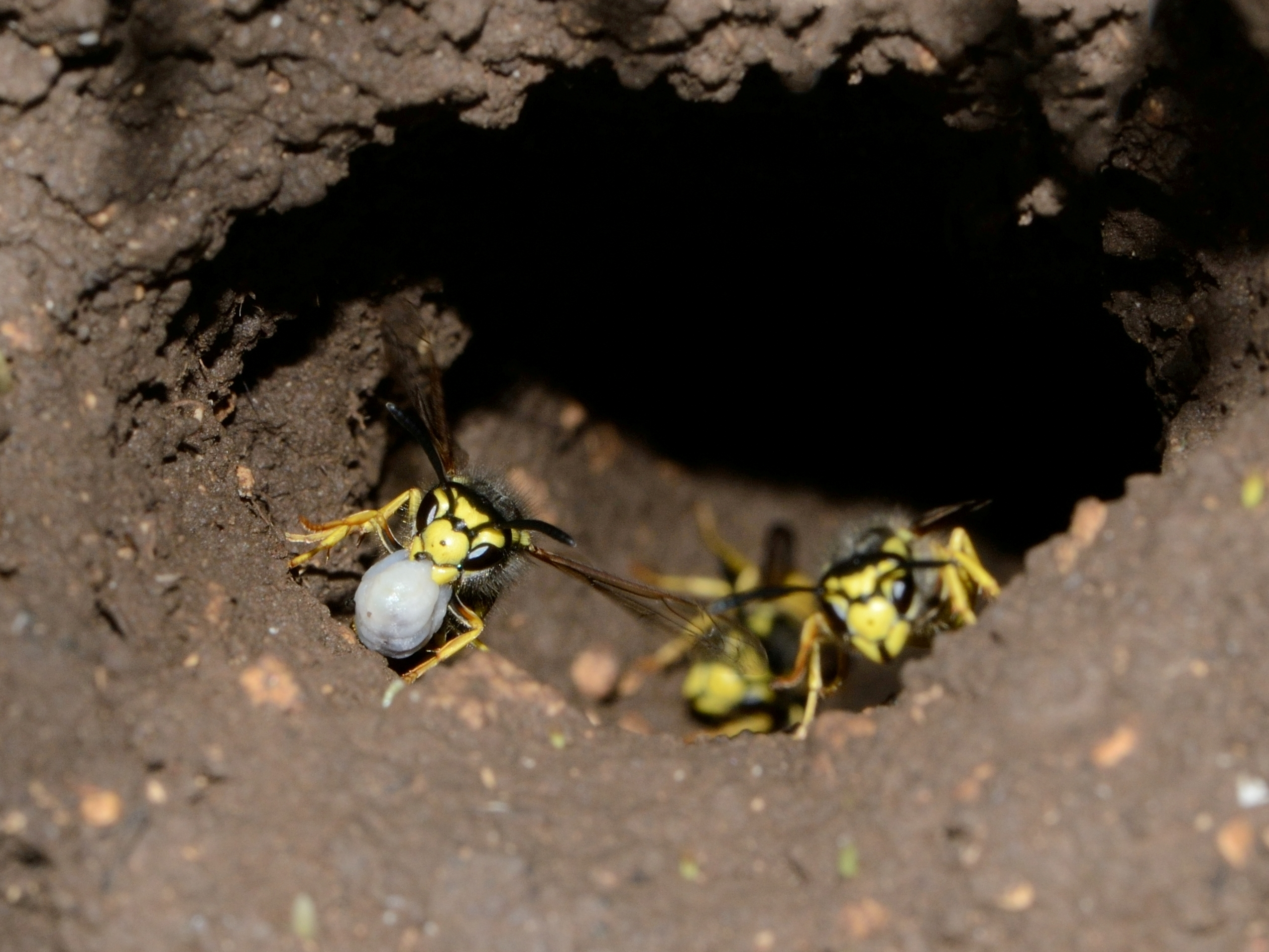
Workers at the nest entrance

Worker policing is selected for when it benefits the colony. The benefits are gained through various measures, such as increasing colony efficiency and establishing a female-based sex-allocation ratio. Worker policing is especially common in colonies where queens mate with multiple males. Thus on average, the workers are more closely related to sons of the queen than to those of other workers. In the past, V. germanica was thought to be an exception to the general pattern that high mating frequency led to low levels of worker reproduction. However, recent studies indicate that while worker reproduction occurs at a considerable rate, worker policing keeps these worker-laid eggs from reaching adulthood. This is demonstrated by a study carried out in Belgium, showing that while an estimated 58.4 percent of male eggs were laid by workers, only 0.44 percent of adult males were workers' sons. The numbers indicate the efficiency with which worker policing is carried out. Policing by aggression, which prevents workers from laying eggs in the first place, leads to increases in colony productivity, while policing by eating the eggs of workers is more likely to result in sex-ratio benefits.

== Diet ==
V. germanica wasps have a diverse diet. They are known to eat carrion, live arthropods (including spiders), fruit, honeydew, and processed human food and garbage. They are opportunistic scavengers and hunters able to obtain food from a variety of different sources. For example, many Vespula species have been observed feeding on dead honey bees (Apis mellifera) found outside the beehive entrance in the late summer. This flexibility in diet is beneficial, because V. germanica must often compete for resources with native biota in areas it invades.

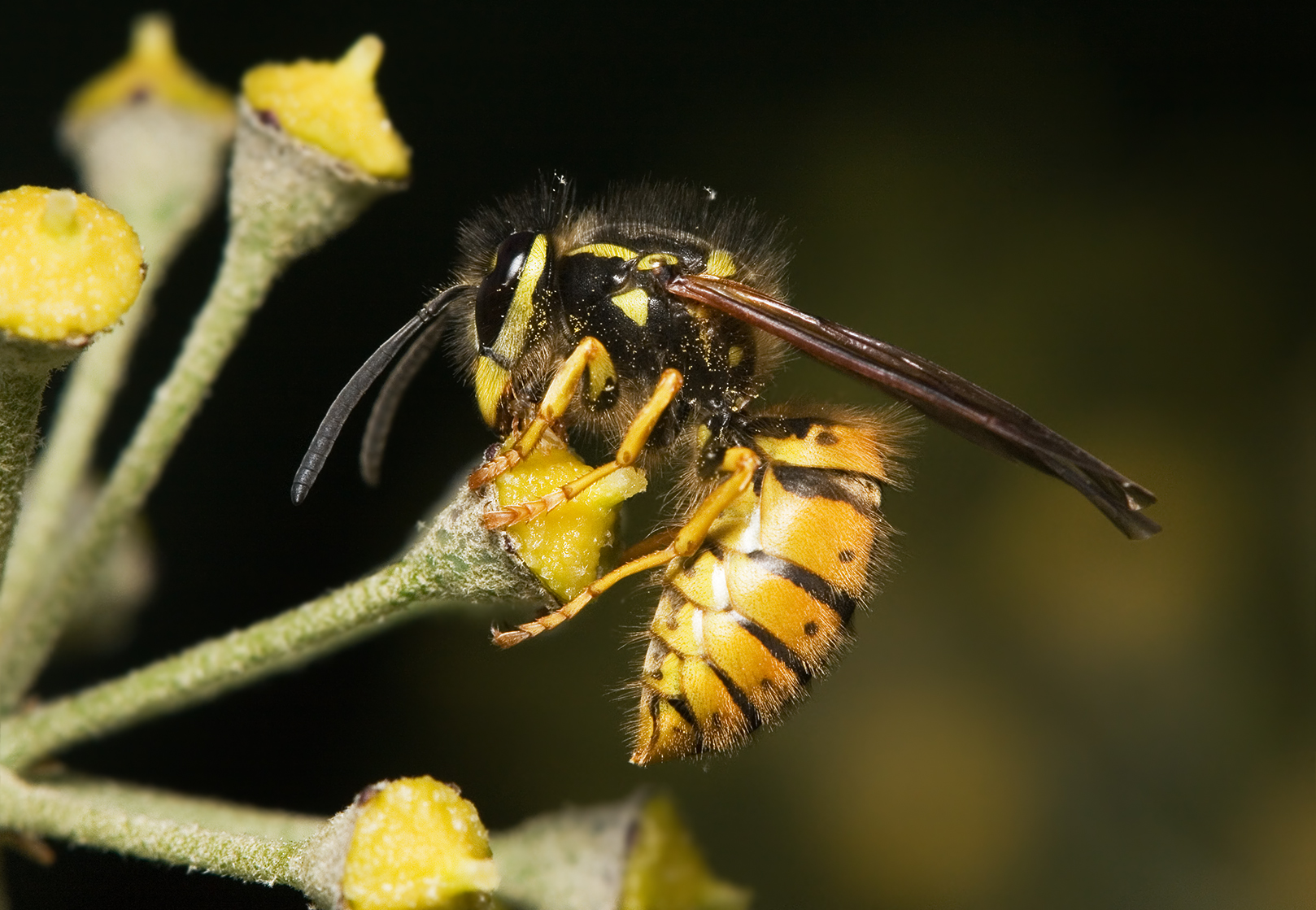

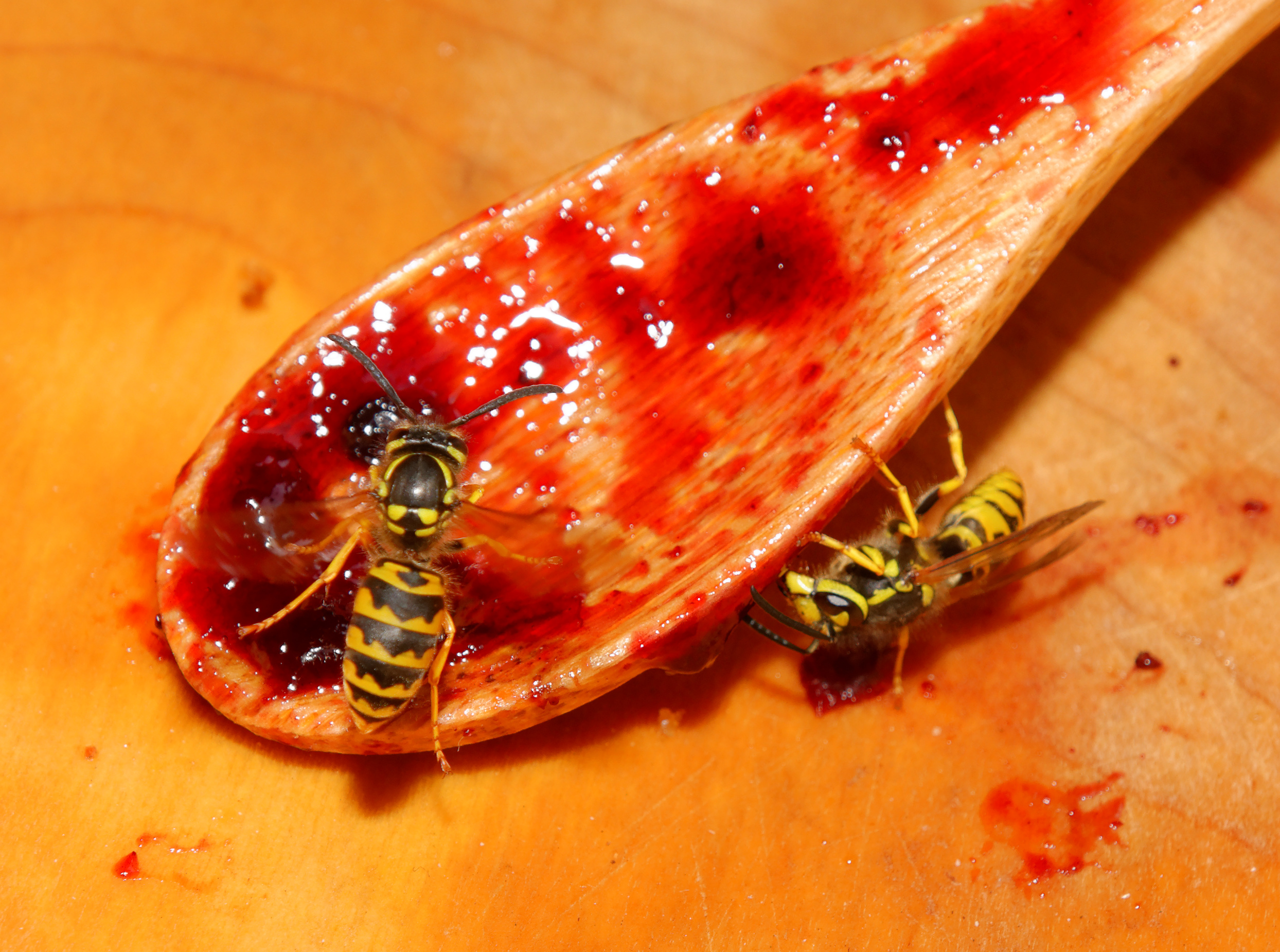
Eating jam from a spoon

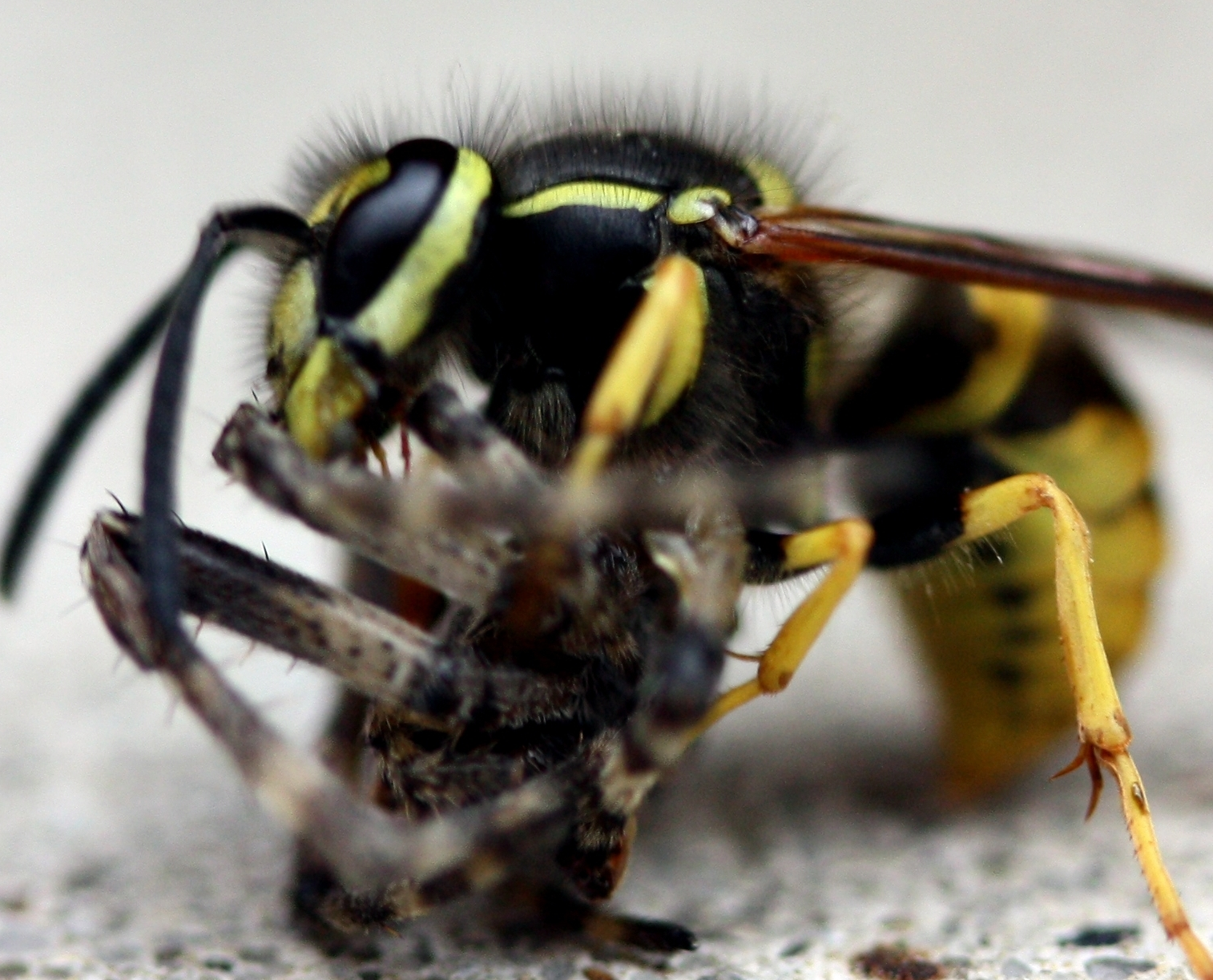
Eating spider

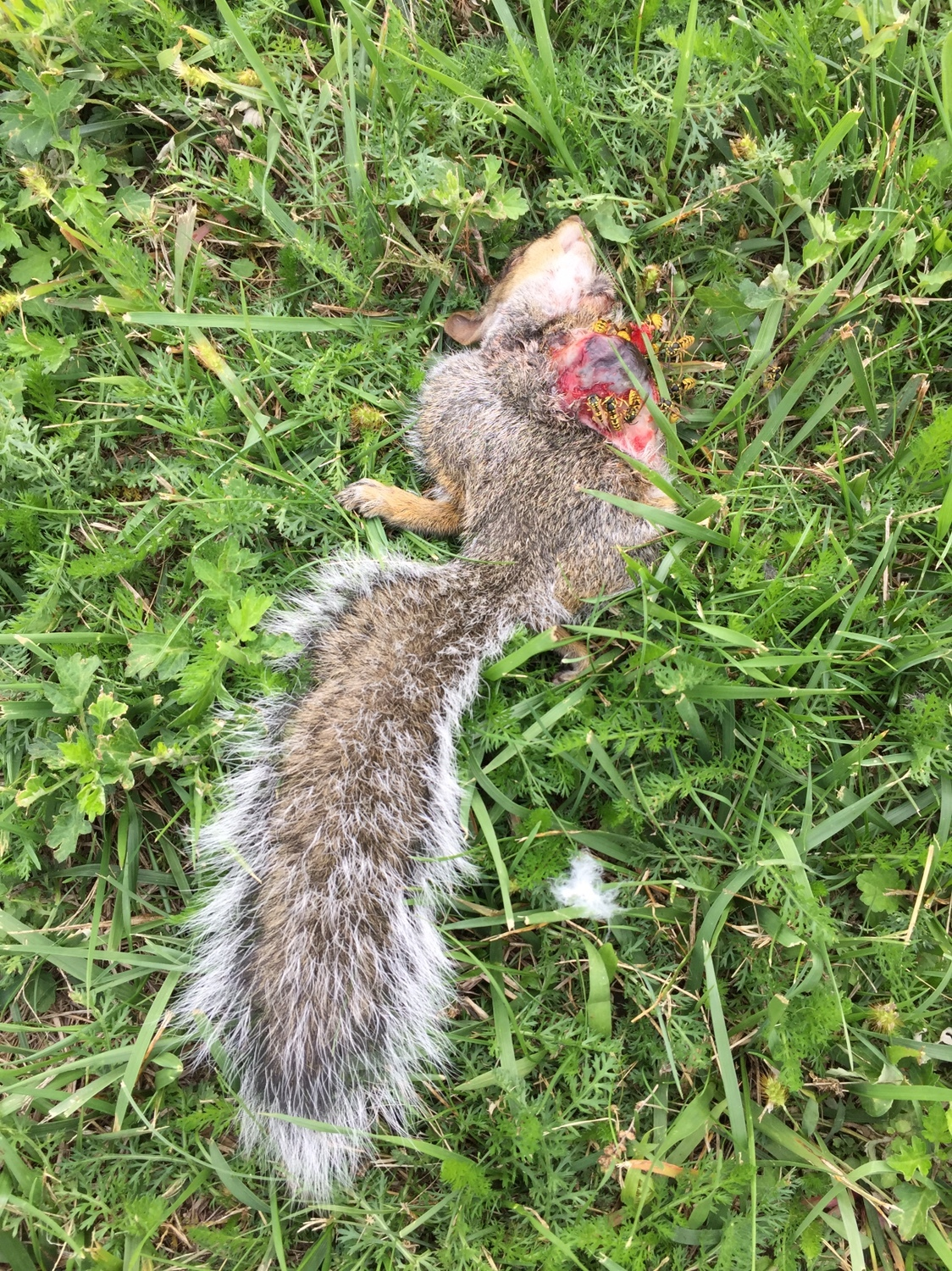
Feeding on an eastern grey squirrel carcass

== Parasites ==
Bee moths (Aphomia sociella) have been known to lay eggs in the nests of V. germanica. Hatched larvae will then feed on the eggs, larvae, and pupae left unprotected by the wasp, sometimes destroying large parts of the nest as they tunnel throughout looking for food.

== Pest status ==
The species is considered a pest in most areas outside its native range, although its long residency in North America means it is not treated with any level of urgency there, unlike in areas such as South America, where the introduction is more recent and the impacts more dramatic.

Along with the closely related common wasp (Vespula vulgaris) and three species of Polistes paper wasps, the German wasp is considered a pest in New Zealand. It was probably introduced in the late 19th century, but did not appear in large numbers until around 1940. Wasp numbers reach their greatest densities in beech forest of the South Island, because of the abundant honeydew produced by the beech-scale insect there. This has a serious effect on forest ecology, as less honeydew remains available for native birds. However, German wasps were quickly succeeded in much of the South Island and its beech forests by Vespula vulgaris accidentally introduced in the 1970s.
