= Book of Enoch (disambiguation) =

Book of Enoch or Apocalypse of Enoch is any of several works that are attributed to the biblical figure Enoch:

- 1 Enoch, commonly just the Book of Enoch, dates to 300 BC and survives only in Ge'ez
- 2 Enoch dates to the 1st century AD; it survives fully only in Old Church Slavonic, although some Coptic fragments have also been found.
- 3 Enoch dates to the 5th century AD and survives in Hebrew
- Liber Logaeth (1583), referred to by John Dee as The Book of Enoch

== See also ==
- Enoch (disambiguation)
