= Enochian (disambiguation) =

Enochian is an occult constructed language recorded in the private journals of John Dee and his colleague Edward Kelley in late 16th-century England.

Enochian may also refer to:

- Enochian chess, a four-player chess variant
- Enochian magic, a system of Renaissance magic developed by John Dee and Edward Kelley
- Enochian Theory, a English rock band

== See also ==
- Enoch (disambiguation)
