= Hanochi =

Hanochi (Hebrew: חנוכי) is a surname. Notable people with the surname include:

- Nitzan Hanochi (born 1986), Israeli basketball player
- Yotam Hanochi (born 2000), Israeli basketball player

== See also ==
- Hanoch
