= Fred Enock =

English microscopist, illustrator and naturalist

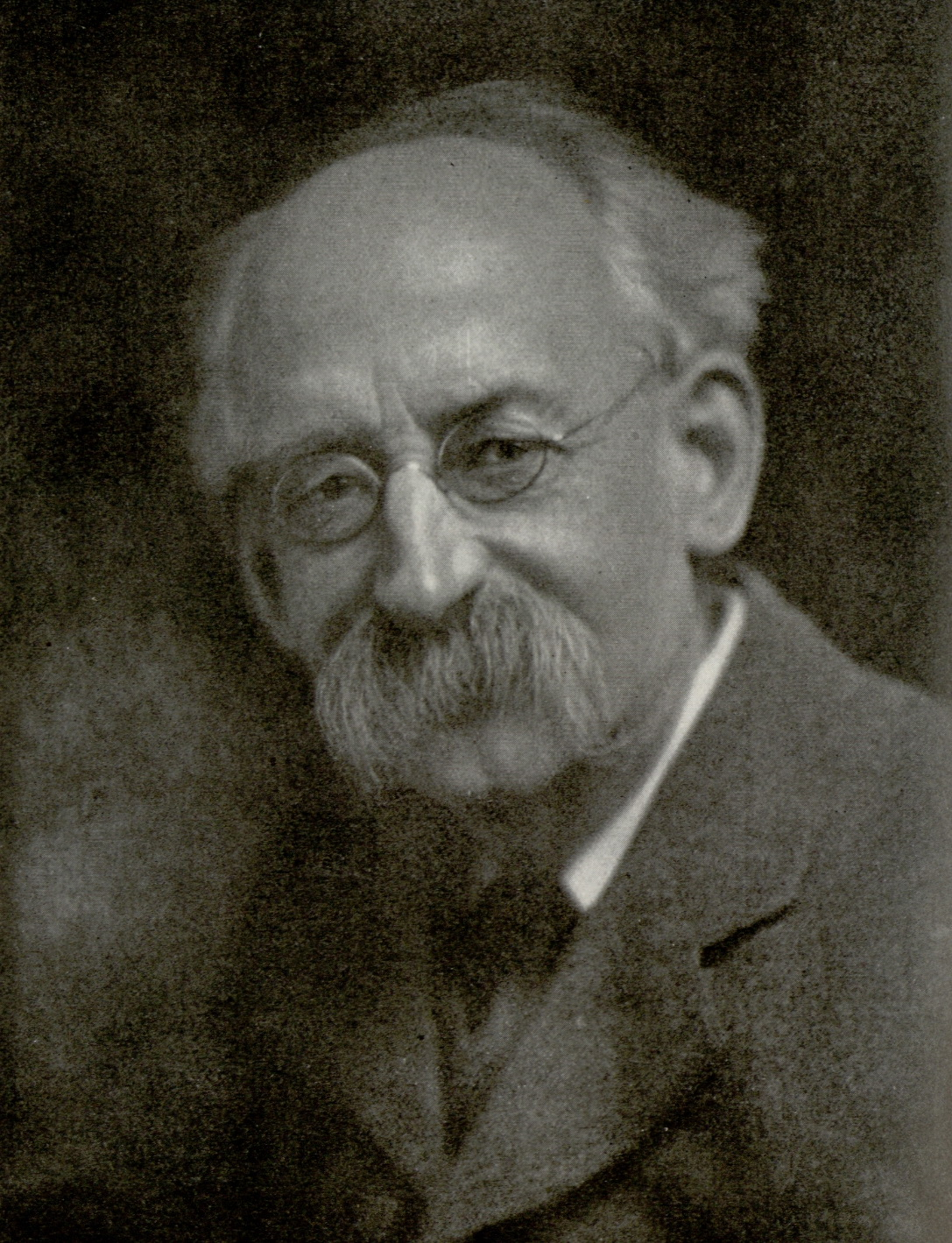

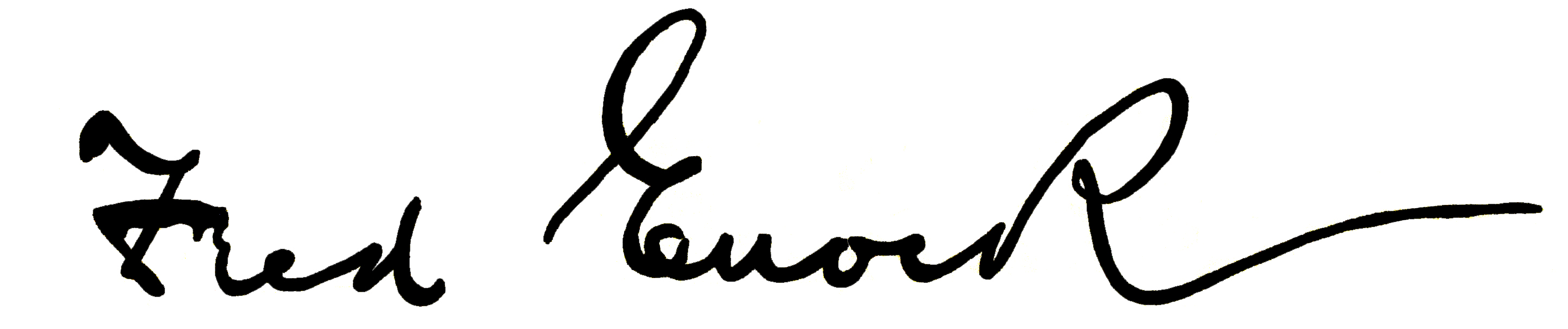

Fred Enock a.k.a. Frederick Enock (17 April 1845 Manchester - 26 May 1916 Hastings) was an English microscopist, illustrator and naturalist.

== Biography ==
His parents were Robert Enock (1811-1855) and Elizabeth Enock (née Doeg) (1810-1867). Their children were Charles Robert Enock (1837-1900), Arthur Henry Enock (1839-1917), Amy Jane Dell (née Enock) (1841-1885), Robinson Enock (1843-1909), Frederick Enock (1845-1916), Emma Enock (1847-1868), Edwin Enock (1849-1924) and Sophia Elizabeth Derrington (née Enock) (1853-1933).

Fred married Jennie Burton (1852-?) on 21 March 1872 at the Hornsey Road Methodist Chapel (now a police station) in Islington, London.

Fred's uncle, Edmund Wheeler, was a commercial slide mounter who became notable for the quality and volume of his preparations from the 1860s to the 1880s, when he sold his business to W. Watson & Sons. Fred Enock assisted in Wheeler's insect preparations through much of the 1870s.

Schooling

14 August 1855 - 1 February 1860 - Ackworth School, Pontefract Road, Ackworth, Pontefract - Robinson, Emma and Edwin all went here, but were in different classes. Between his tenth and fifteenth year, Fred did not see his family except for the one-month annual summer holiday. Most of his family from his grandfather down, had also attended Ackworth School.

His occupation at the various times of census was given as 1861 - Machinist apprentice, 1871 - Naturalist, 1881 - Professor of Natural History (microscopic), 1891 - Scientific Lecturer Natural History, 1901 - Lecturer in Science School, 1911 - Science Lecturer

Addresses before marriage

- 59 Stock Street, Cheetham, Manchester 1845-c1846
- Stratford Road, Sparkbrook, Birmingham 1851-c1854
- Balsall Heath Road, Balsall Heath, Birmingham 1861-?
- 48 Tollington Road, Islington 1871-1872 (with uncle Edmund Wheeler)

After marriage

- 3 Andover Road, Islington 1872-?
- 2 Mount Pleasant Rd, Upper Holloway 1873
- 25 Balsall Heath Rd, Birmingham 1874
- 30 Russell Rd, Islington 1880-1882
- Ferndale, Woking Station 1882-1883
- 21 Prospero Rd, Upper Holloway 1885
- 11 Parolles Rd, Upper Holloway 1889
- 21 Manor Gardens, Holloway 1895-1898
- 13 Tufnell Park Rd, Holloway 1911-1915
- 54 St Mary's Terrace, West Hill, Hastings 1916

== Gallery ==
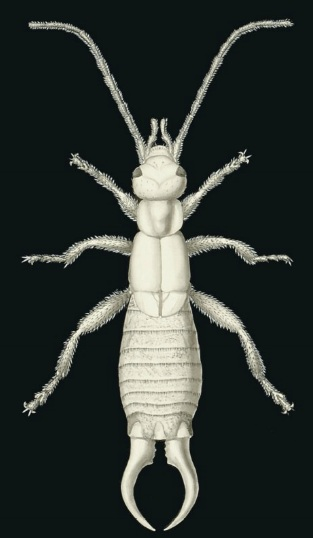
Earwig

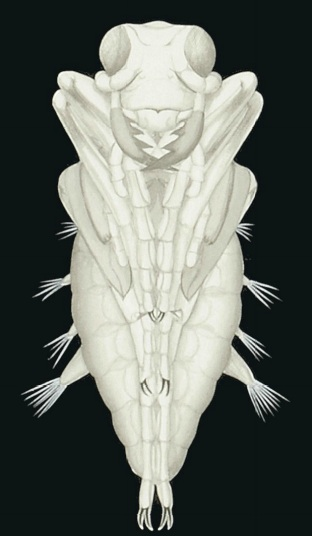
Tiger beetle - Cicindela campestris

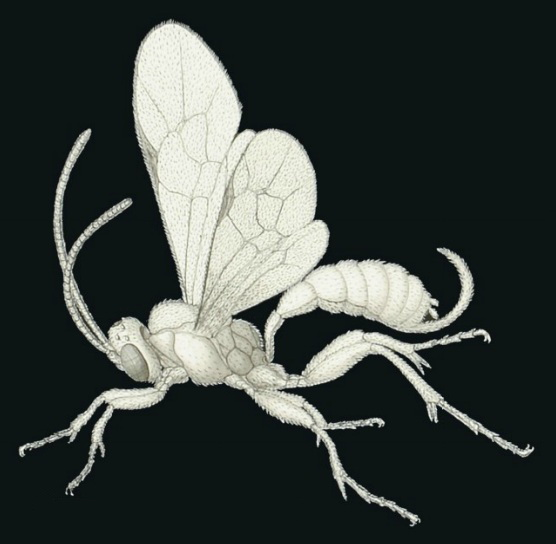
Willow Saw Fly (Nematus oligospilus)

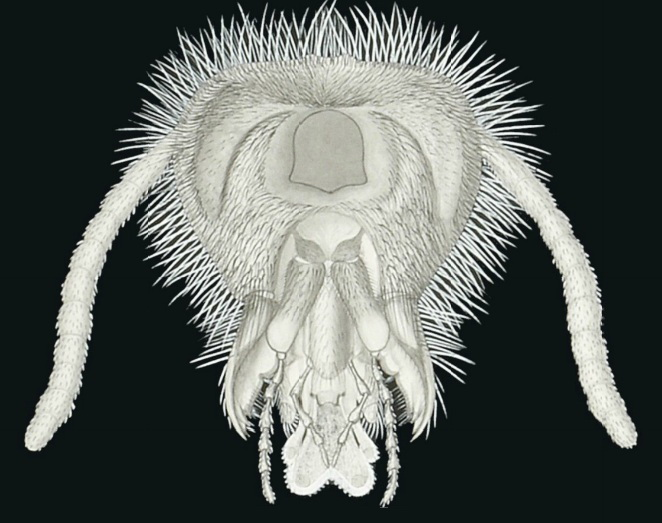
Head of Vespa vulgaris

== Bibliography ==
- Davidson, B.M. 'Fred Enock 1845-1916—The Man and His Work', Microscopy, 36 (Autumn 1992), pp. 657–674
