= Nkulanga Enock =

Ugandan advocate for children's rights

Enock Nkulanga
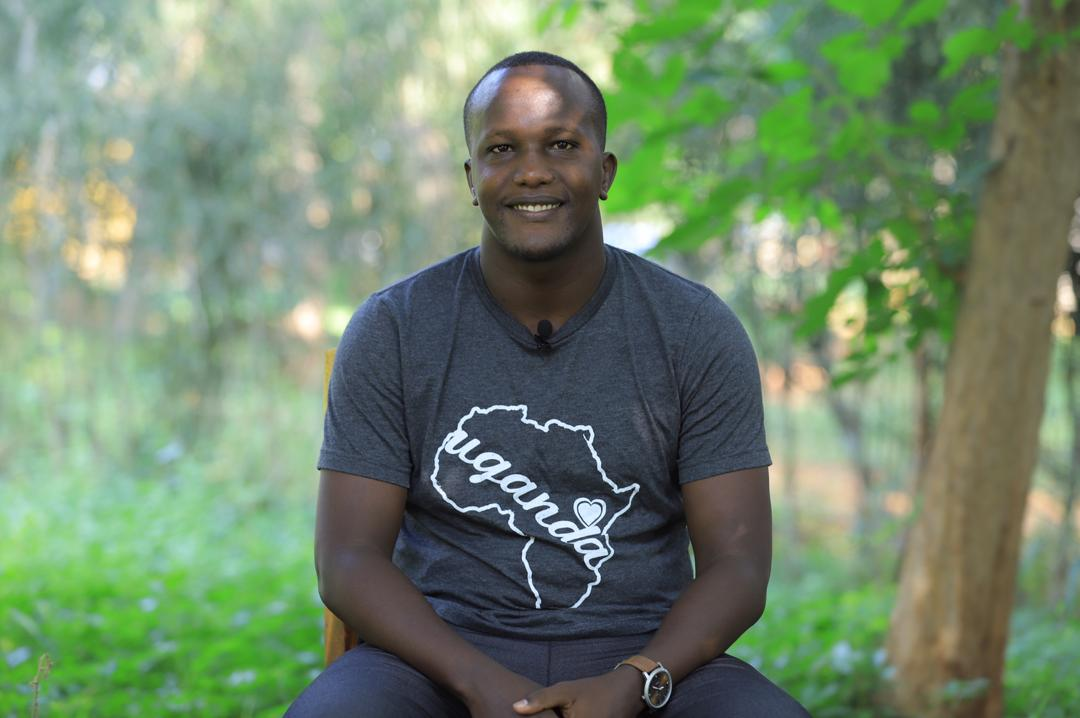
- Born: Enock Nkulanga; January 26, 1990 (age 36); Nakasongola District, Uganda
- Citizenship: Ugandan
- Education: Makerere University (BA in Development Studies)
- Occupations: Development practitioner, youth advocate
- Years active: 2013–present
- Organization(s): LeadMinds Africa; African Children's Mission; Theirworld

Enock Nkulanga (born 26 January 1990) is a Ugandan development practitioner whose career spans education, community development, youth leadership development and advocacy. His work was recognized by the former President of the United States, Barack Obama in 2018 as he delivered the Mandela Lecture in Johannesburg, South Africa.

Nkulanga is the founder of LeadMinds Africa, a non-profit organization empowering the next generation of leaders in Africa. His past positions include the Country Director of African Children's Mission, an international nonprofit with operations in Uganda and Kenya. Nkulanga has also served as the Global Youth Ambassador at Theirworld where he advocated and campaigned for children's rights to education.

== Career & Education ==
Nkulanga went to Katuugo SDA located in Nakasongola District, Kakooge Sub-County for his primary education. He then attended Ekitangaala Primary School, where he sat for Primary Leaving Examinations. He later joined Secondary School.

Nkulanga completed his bachelor's degree in Development Studies at Makerere University and has been working in the Non-profit sector/international development since 2013.

Nkulanga is also a Mandela Institute for Development Studies fellow, who strongly believes that Africa's future is dependent on the quality of emerging young leaders. Enock is one of the emerging young leaders accepted into the African Presidential Leaders Program (APLP) in Egypt. He has been hosted on national television as an outstanding emerging leader and featured in different publications.
