= Henoch =

Henoch may refer to:

- Henoch (journal), on the history of Judaism
- Henoch–Schönlein purpura, a vascular disease
- Henoch Leibowitz (1918–2008), Lithuanian-American rabbi
- Chanoch Henoch Bornsztain (died 1965), Polish rabbi
- Eduard Heinrich Henoch (1820–1910), German physician
- Lilli Henoch (1899–1942), German world record holder in the discus, shot put, and relay
- Maxim Litvinov (1876–1951), born Meir Henoch Mojszewicz Wallach-Finkelstein, Russian revolutionary and diplomat
- Henoch (fictional character), one of three incorporeal beings in the Star Trek episode "Return to Tomorrow"

== See also ==
- Enoch (disambiguation)
- Hanoch (disambiguation)
