= Mercaz HaTorah =

Coordinates: 31°44′55.24″N 35°13′15.6″E

Mercaz HaTorah is a Lithuanian-style (non-hasidic) Orthodox yeshiva located in the Arnona neighborhood of Jerusalem.

Mercaz HaTorah was founded by Rabbi Aryeh Rottman, and is led by his son, Rabbi Mordechai Rottman, who is the rosh yeshiva (dean).

The yeshiva caters primarily to students from the English-speaking world.

== History ==
Rottman founded Mercaz HaTorah in 1970 as a post-high school institute for Judaic and Talmudic legal studies. The yeshiva started with 15 students in a two-story building in the Arnona neighborhood of Jerusalem.

== Campus and enrollment ==
Mercaz HaTorah has three buildings. Students are from the English-speaking world, with most coming from the United States.
