= Enock Tombe Stephen =

South Sudanese bishop

Enock Tombe (born 12 July 1952) is the South Sudanese Bishop Emeritus of the Episcopal Church of South Sudan.

== Biography ==
Bishop Enock Tombe Stephen was the second bishop of Rejaf diocese after he preceded Bishop Michael Sokiri Lugor in October 2009, and consecrated bishop in December 2009. He was enthroned in December 2010. He retired in January 2018 at the age of sixty five.

Enock Tombe Stephen is a civil engineer by profession and graduated from the University of Khartoum. He studied theology in London and was ordained pastor of the Anglican episcopal Church of Sudan (ECS) in 1990.

He worked with the Norwegian Church Aid (NCA) in southern Sudan during the liberation war against Khartoum. In 1995 he was appointed general secretary of the Sudan Council of Churches in Khartoum and served for two terms 1995-1999 and 1999–2003. He was a team leader of Faith-Based Organizations (FBOs) during the South Sudanese peace negotiations in Addis Ababa, Ethiopia, from 2014 to 2015. From 2005 to 2015 he served as a member of Board of Governors of Nairobi Peace Initiative Africa (NPI/A). The retired bishop is a member of the Joint Monitoring and Evaluation Commission (JMEC) since 2015, a body to monitor the implementation of the 2015 peace agreement. He is the head of the faith based in the IGAD-led High Level Revitalization Forum in Addis-Ababa, Ethiopia.
