= Suzy Enoch =

Scottish writer, director and actress

- Born: Suzanne Enoch; Aberdeen, Scotland
- Education: Italia Conti Academy of Theatre Arts
- Alma mater: St. Andrews University

Suzy Enoch is a Scottish writer, director and actress based in Edinburgh. Enoch was born in Aberdeen and trained as an actress in London at the Italia Conti Academy of Theatre Arts.

Enoch founded and ran the First Draft Theatre Company (now Blank Pages) in 2006 in London, which commissioned and produced original plays with themes related to current events and performed with cast and directors who had not previously met.

In 2007, Enoch founded the Aberdeen-based Writers & Actors Collaboration Theatre Company together with Colin Garrow and Liz Lees. With the support of Aberdeen Council, WAC Theatre, produced a series of plays working with local writers, directors and actors. Enoch's writing and directing work with WAC Theatre:

- RealiTV, a satirical black comedy inspired by the TV programme Big Brother, written and directed by Enoch, premiered at Aberdeen Arts Centre in August 2009, followed by performances at the Edinburgh Fringe Festival.
- No Phones on Planet Pluto, tales inspired by the stories of mental health services users, co-written and directed by Enoch.

Enoch's acting roles with WACtheatre include The Body in the Bag and WLTM, Towards the inevitability of Catastrophe.

The Jabberwocky is a stage adaptation of the Lewis Carroll play of the same name written and directed by Enoch and produced for the Edinburgh Fringe Festival in 2011.
