= Hanoch Hecht =

Rabbi known for 6 minute Torah classes and director of Jewish groups in New York, USA

Hanoch Hecht, also known as the 6 Minute Rabbi, is the spiritual leader of the Rhinebeck Jewish in Rhinebeck, NY and director of Chabad of Dutchess County. He is the son of Shea Hecht and the grandson of the late Jacob J. Hecht.

== Biography ==
Hanoch Hecht is one of ten children to Shea and Bella Hecht, born in Brooklyn, NY. He grew up as a sixth generation Brooklynite and attended the Lubavitch Yeshiva Central School System, where he received a BA in rabbinical studies. He received his rabbinic ordination in São Paulo, Brazil.

Hecht assumed rabbinical leadership at a very young age, starting with Chabad of Dutchess County where he is the director. The Chabad Dutchess House is designed to serve the students of the many colleges in Dutchess County. He then founded a modern orthodox style Chabad synagogue, the Rhinebeck Jewish Center, along with his wife Tzivie, where they head numerous programs that benefit the community on a daily basis.

Hecht was chosen to be one of the 40 under 40 by the Dutchess County Chamber of Commerce in 2016. This acknowledgment chooses the 40 biggest shakers and doers under the age of 40.

== Six Minute Rabbi ==
Hecht is also known as the Six Minute Rabbi. He is known for teaching about the Torah and Jewish faith in 6 minutes. These Torah classes have been written about in many Jewish publications such as the Jewish week and Ami magazine.

== First rabbi ever to compete on Food Network's Chopped ==
Hecht competed on Food Network's popular show Chopped (episode "Leap of Faith") where he competed against a priest, a nun-in-training, and a pastor in the Chopped Kitchen! He made history by competing and not tasting any of the food he cooked because it was prepared in a non kosher kitchen. His recipes have been featured in publications all over the globe as he explores kosher and modern Jewish Cuisine.

== Radio and press ==
Hecht was a co-host of the Shema Yisroel Radio Program heard in the Hudson Valley every Sunday morning on three different stations. He has written some very provocative op-ed pieces. He also made headlines when he taught newly elected senator Kirsten Gillibrand about orthodox Jews not shaking hands of the opposite gender.

== Model citizen ==
Hecht has fought for more police in Crown Heights, Brooklyn, NY to help stop hate crimes.

== Helping Jewish life on campus at CIA ==
Hecht is extensively involved in the Jewish campus life at the Culinary Institute of America. Aside from Kosher lectures at the school, he hosts numerous events throughout the year catered to the students to provide a Jewish flavor to accompany their CIA experience. He also hosts Shabbat meals at his house for any students who wish to attend.

== Toys for hospitalized children ==
Taking a leaf out of his father Shea's book, Hecht is an active volunteer for Toys for Hospitalized Children, a program that provides toys for children around the country that are unfortunately hospitalized.

== Birkat HaChama ==
Hecht has brought global awareness to special Birkat Hachama blessing by going up in a hot air balloon, together with Gaddy Yaari, and performing the blessings from the sky.

== Publications ==
Hecht is the author of A Kabbalah of Food published by Monkfish publishing reviewed in Publishers weekly " Rabbi Hecht, a former competitor on the Food Network show Chopped, combines his passion for Jewish teaching and food in this entertaining volume. He contends that "[c]ooking, sharing, and enjoying food... creates a dwelling place for God within us and allows us to elevate the spark of godliness within the physical world."
