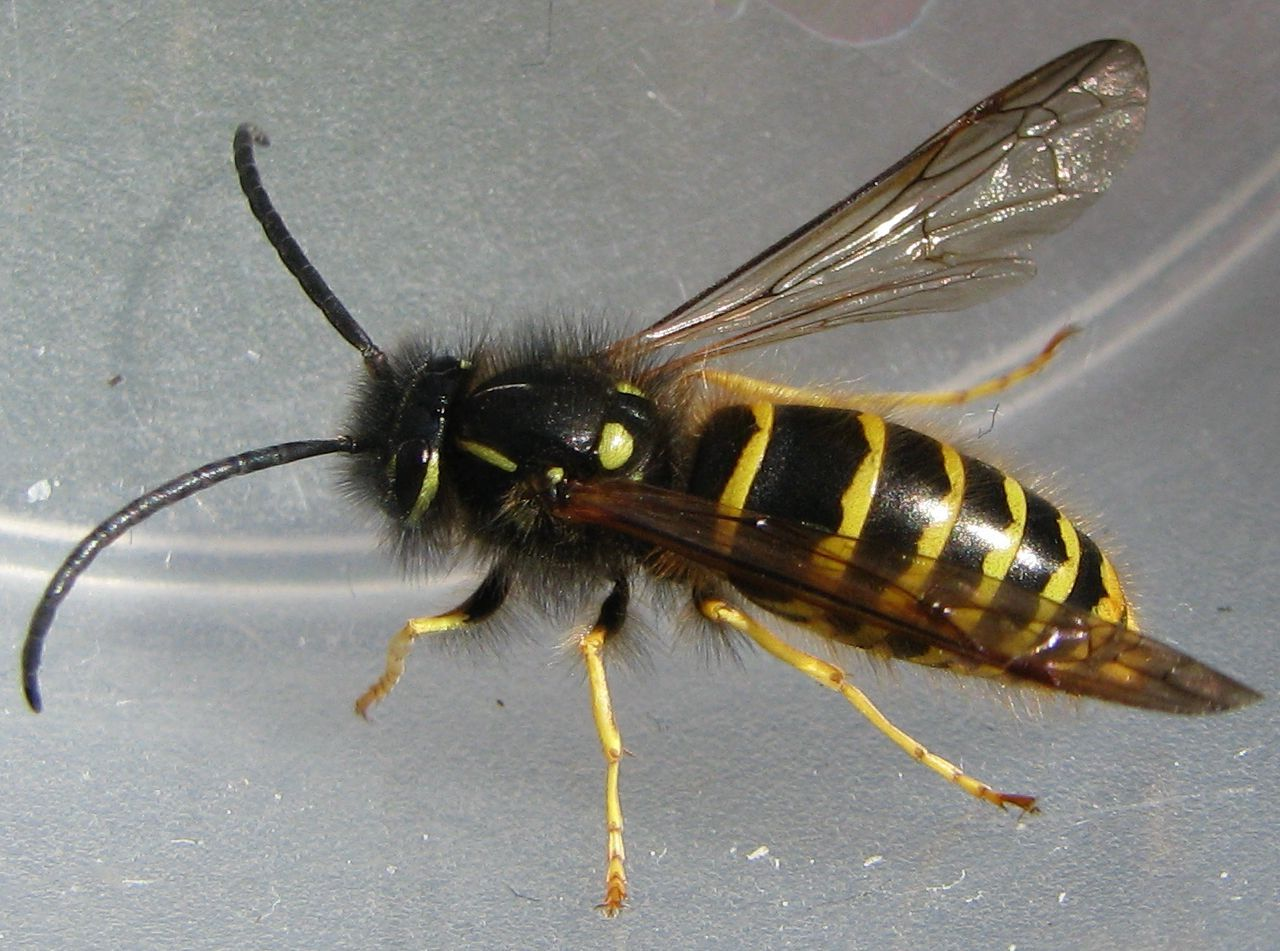
- Male

Scientific classification
- Kingdom: Animalia
- Phylum: Arthropoda
- Clade: Pancrustacea
- Class: Insecta
- Order: Hymenoptera
- Family: Vespidae
- Genus: Vespula
- Species: V. vulgaris

Binomial name
- Vespula vulgaris (Linnaeus, 1758)

Synonyms
- Vespa vulgaris Linnaeus, 1758; Vespa sexcincta Panzer, 1799; Vespa westwoodii Shipp, 1893; Vespa westwoodi Dalla Torre, 1904 (Lapsus); Vespa vulgaris var. pseudogermanica Stolfa, 1932; Vespula rufosignata Eck, 1998; Vespula vulgaris vetus Eck, 1999; Paravespula vulgaris (Linnaeus. 1758)

= Vespula vulgaris =

Common wasp

Species of insect

Vespula vulgaris, known as the common wasp, is a species of wasp found in regions that include the United Kingdom, Ireland, Germany, India, China, New Zealand and Australia. It is sometimes known in English as the European wasp, but the same name is used for the species Vespula germanica or German wasp. In 2010, the ostensibly Vespula vulgaris wasps in North America were found to be a different species, Vespula alascensis.

== Basic features ==
Vespula vulgaris is a eusocial vespid that builds its tan paper nest in or on a structure capable of supporting it. A founding queen searches for a hollow tree, wall cavity, rock crevice, or even a hole made by other animals to build a nest. The extraordinary adaptation skills of V. vulgaris enable it to live in a wide range of habitats, from very humid areas to artificial environments such as gardens and human structures. This species, along with other wasp species such as V. germanica, has impacted ecosystems, especially those in New Zealand and Australia, where they were imported by humans, and frequently cause damage to fruit crops and endanger humans.

== Taxonomy ==
The name Vespula vulgaris comes from the origin of the word vulgaris, which means "common" in Latin, therefore giving the name "common wasp". This species has many synonyms such as "common wasp", "European wasp", Paravespula vulgaris, or "common yellow jacket". However, a study from 2010 revealed that Vespula vulgaris and the American common yellow jacket are actually two different species, the latter now known as Vespula alascensis. It is closely related to another wasp species, Vespula austriaca, and is considered a sister taxon.

In 2009, the species Vespula rufosignata Eck, 1998 was synonymised with Vespula vulgaris.

Common wasps are colloquially called "jaspers" in some English regions (Dorset, Lincolnshire, and elsewhere in the English Midlands); whether this comes from the Latin vespa or from the abdomen resembling the striped mineral jasper, is not clear.

== Description and identification ==
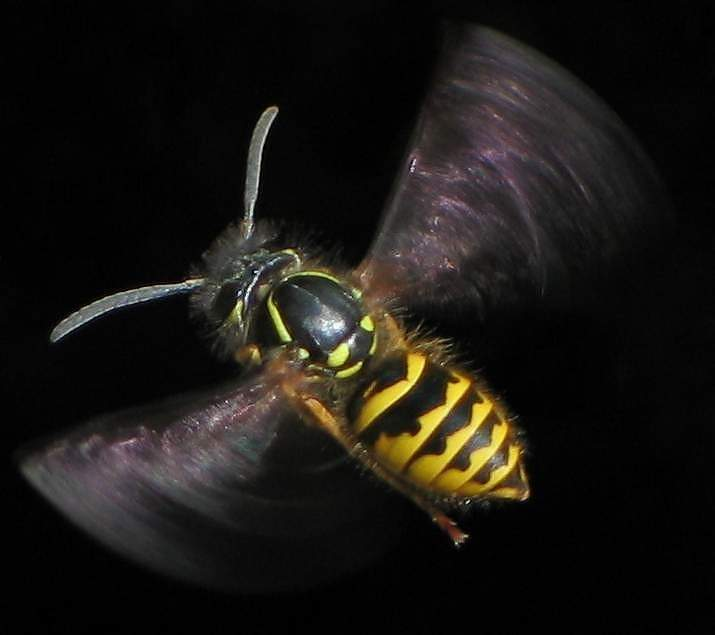
Worker in flight

Adult workers of V. vulgaris measure about 12–17 mm (0.5–0.7 in) from head to tip of abdomen, and weigh 84.1 ± 19.0 mg, whereas the queen is about 20 mm (0.8 in) long. It has aposematic colours of black and yellow; yellow pronotal bands which are almost parallel to each other and black dots and rings on its abdomen. The queens and workers appear very similar to Vespula germanica, except when they are seen head on, as the V. vulgaris face lacks the three black dots of V. germanica. Instead, each has only one black mark on its clypeus, which is usually anchor or dagger-shaped. This applies to queens and workers only. In addition, identification of this species may be difficult because the black mark on its clypeus can sometimes appear broken, making it again look similar to V. germanica. It is prudent to use multiple identifying characteristics and if in any doubt to consult experts.

Still more difficult to distinguish between species are the males. Almost undetectable with the naked eye, the only confident identification of V. vulgaris males is to seek the distinct aedeagus tip shapes and lateral processes of their genitalia.

== Distribution and habitat ==
V. vulgaris is a Palearctic species. It has been discovered in a wide range of countries, including the United Kingdom, Germany, India, and China. It is invasive in New Zealand and Australia, and South America. Until 2010, it was thought to be in North America as well, but molecular and morphological data showed that specimens identified as V. vulgaris there were Vespula alascensis, which had previously been considered a taxonomic synonym, but is now considered a separate species.

V. vulgaris has high adaptation skills for environments. It flourishes in most types of habitats, including prairie, grassland, natural and planted forests, shrub lands, and even in urban zones such as gardens, orchards, and buildings. However, it does require the temperature to be moderately warm, because its foraging activity is temperature-dependent (above 2 °C [36 °F]).

== Northern Hemisphere colony cycle ==
Five distinguishable stages occur in V. vulgaris colony cycle in the temperate parts of the Northern Hemisphere. Each lasts for similar periods, around 30–35 days. The colony starts in April as the queen begins the foundation of the nest and degenerates around October when the temperature drops and the queen dies. The size of the colony ranges from 3000 larvae up to a maximum of 8000 larvae, with the queen producing around 200–300 eggs per day for 24 days.

- Stage 1 – solitary stage: the queen builds the nest, provisions the cells and rears the first brood of workers.
- Stage 2 – rapid increase: the workers replace the queen as the foraging force. The queen is now a nurse and egg producer. There is very rapid buildup of worker population.
- Stage 3 – slow increase: the rate of population growth is not as rapid as in stage 2.
- Stage 4 – climax of colony: worker population no longer increases. Cells built are all queen cells. Males emerge, as do unmated queens, and foraging rate per worker increases. Drones and queens mate, and the queens hibernate to emerge in the spring, when the cycle repeats with stage 1.
- Stage 5 – decline: probably caused by death or sickness of queen. Colony cohesion breaks down, cannibalism sets in, and the foraging becomes erratic.

== Brood production ==
The general incubation period is five days, but it can occasionally be seven, due to cannibalism, scavenging, or replacement. The larval period can depend on the trophic condition inside and outside the nest. If there are abundant resources of food being brought into the nest, the larval period is short, but if the resource is short, the period can lengthen. The first adult emerges after around 23 days of hatching and the queen-pupated brood is completed in about a month (30 days).

The first brood of workers are all of normal size, but the next generation of them is generally smaller, due to a decrease in the queen's foraging activity after producing the first batch of larvae. As the queen's foraging decreases, the second group of workers does not get so much food, often starves, and so spends more time in the larval stage.

== Nest foundation by the queen ==
After coming out of hibernation in the spring, the queen forages for flowers or shrubs and begins looking for nesting sites. She flies low on the ground, searching for any round, dark object or depression. If it is a hole, she flies in to inspect the details if it is suitable and if not moves on to the next hole. What constitutes a "perfect" nest is yet to be discovered, but it is mainly speculated that the queen's physiological state is the main deciding factor of the time and the place of nesting. When she has found a suitable site for nesting, she performs dance-like wing movements which allow her to locate the site even after she has left the area.

After she has fixed the position of the nest, she begins to build it. She repeats the procedure of bringing in a pulp, attaching it to the nest to form a spindle and flying back out to bring in more pulp. During this process, the queen clings to the nest with her two posterior pairs of legs and attaches the pulp using her anterior legs and mouth parts. She builds 20–30 cells before initial egg-laying, fashioning a petiole and producing a single cell at the end of it. Six further cells are then added around this to produce the characteristic hexagonal shape of the nest cells. One egg is laid in each cell, and as it hatches, each larva holds itself in the vertical cell by pressing its body against the sides.

When the nest is completed, the queen is replaced by the workers as the foraging force and instead is now concerned only with nursing and egg producing. Her ovaries develop, her abdomen becomes distended with eggs, and she loses the ability to fly.

After the founding phase has been completed, the colony encounters a change where the workers begin to build queen cells. Once the workers start building on the queen cells, no more worker cells are built, but those that still have brood growing in them are retained. The majority of the food resource brought in by the workers is fed to the queen larvae, known as gynes and the lack of feeding for other larvae causes the prolongation of their larval periods. To ensure that only the queen's eggs are reared to adulthood, female workers remove worker-laid eggs in a process known as worker policing.

When the queen has completed her job of producing daughter queen larvae, she dies, leaving a crop of virgin queens which will leave the nest, mate, hibernate, and reproduce in the following spring. After the queen's death, the coordination of the colony breaks down and the workers begin to lay eggs. The rate and amount of foraging decrease drastically after the queen's death, so it is unable to support all the workers and their brood. This is when cannibalism occurs among the workers and furthermore, the workers tear off their cells and carry them out of the nest, dropping the temperature of the entire nest. Once this stage is reached, the remaining workers die of cold or starvation.

== Nest ==
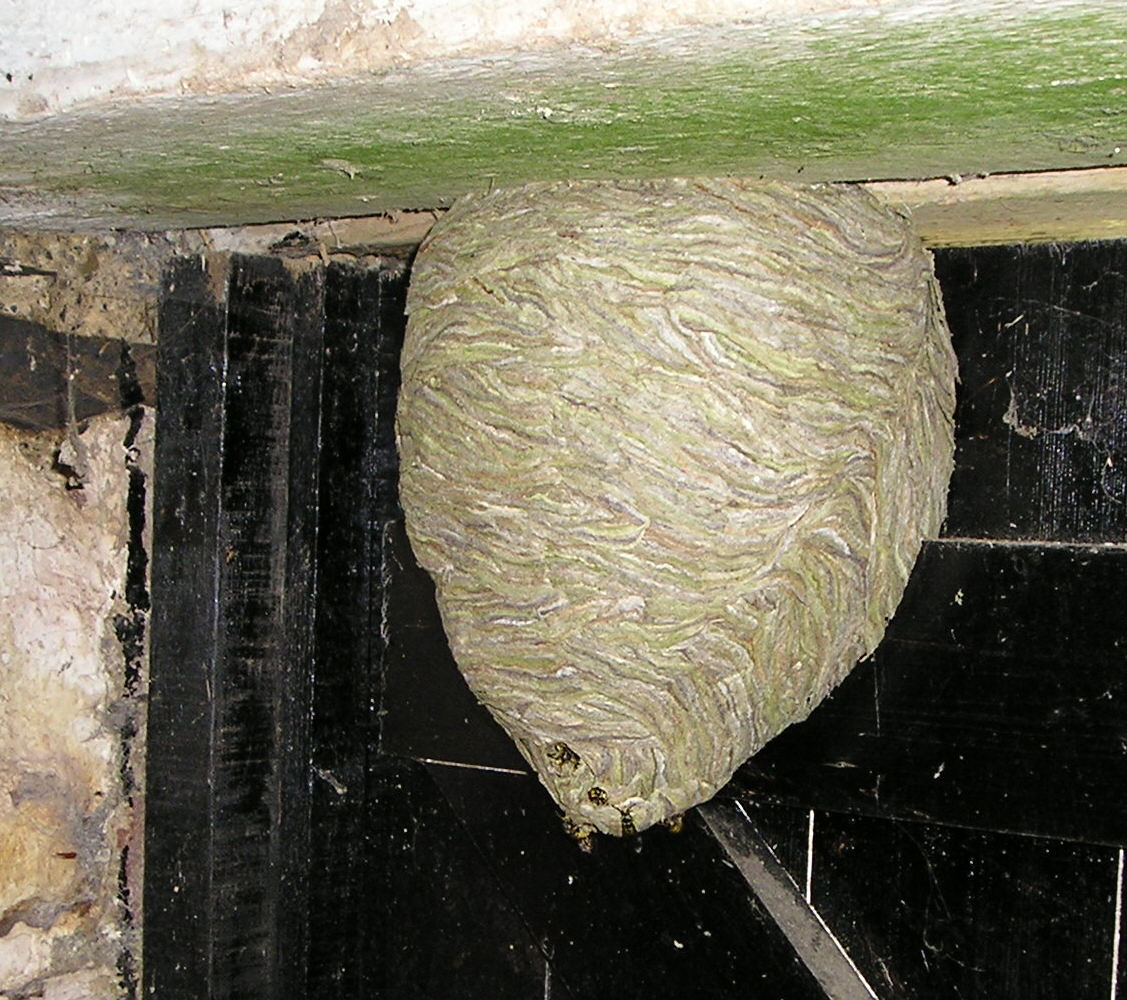
Nest composed of chewed wood fibres

A V. vulgaris nest is made from chewed wood fibres mixed with worker saliva. It is generally made of brittle tan coloured paper. It has open cells and a cylindrical column known as a petiole attaching the nest to the substrate. The wasps produce a chemical which repels ants and secrete it around the base of the petiole, to avoid ant predation.

Many variations are seen in the characteristics of the nests within the species. Aerial nests and nests that are very close to the surface of the ground have much thicker envelopes than those under the ground. The wasps build thick envelopes to prevent heat from escaping. Also, smaller nests have thicker envelopes than larger nests. This is mainly due to the fact that the amount of heat produced is proportional to the volume of the nest. The larger a nest is the better it will be in conserving the nest warmth. The optimal temperature of the nest is around 32 °C (90 °F). However, when the temperature rises above the optimal temperature (during hot days), the workers use their wings as fans to cool the nest down.

V. vulgaris wasps recognise their nests by making pheromone trails from the entrance of their nest to the site of foraging. Those "footprints" are not colony specific, but species specific. Although many other insects such as ants produce such pheromone trails as well, Vespula vulgaris generate pheromone either by special abdominal glands or from the gut.

Although the two species Vespula vulgaris and Vespula germanica have extremely similar biological features, characteristics of their nests are distinctive. Vespula germanica nests generally survive the winter, while those of Vespula vulgaris do not. This difference is due mainly to the variation in prey. Vespula vulgaris food sources are greatly affected by temperature, while those of Vespula germanica are not, providing them with a higher chance of survival even during the winter. Because many Vespula germanica are able to overwinter and most Vespula vulgaris are not, except for the queen, this affects the nest size of the two species. Vespula germanica generally have slightly bigger nest size (3500–9000 larvae in one colony cycle) than Vespula vulgaris (3000–8000 larvae in one colony cycle).

== Behaviors ==
=== Dance-like wing movement of queen ===
When the queen has found the appropriate nesting site, she orients in a similar way as the workers and flies back out of the hole. She flies frontwards and backwards in front of the nest with a slow, hovering flight and repeats this movement until its distance is further away from the hole. When the arc of the flight increases up to about 6 ft (183 cm), the pathway makes a figure of a sideways "8" and when the queen is about 60 ft (18 m) away from the nest site, she then flies in a straight line. This is how the queen Vespula vulgaris marks the land, in respect to the landmarks around the nesting site.

=== Defensive behaviours ===
Only wasps leaving the nest notice a disturbance and defend or fight off an intruder. The ones returning to the nest do not detect any disturbance and try to enter the nest. The workers that detect danger show a certain gesture – they rise onto the tips of their tarsi, put forward their heads, turn down their abdomens and constantly vibrate their wings in high frequencies and short beats. This behaviour signals other workers to fly to the entrance of the nest and defend. However, if the nest is disturbed enough times, the workers stop defending the nest and instead grow tolerant to such attacks. However, when they detect life-threatening level of danger, the Vespula vulgaris workers will vigorously defend their nest. Unlike honey bees, which die after stinging, Vespula vulgaris can sting multiple times. This makes its sting viable for personal defence when away from the colony, and the common wasp is therefore more apt to sting. However, it will usually not sting without being provoked by sudden movement or other violent behaviour.

Research indicates the wasps use odour to identify and attack rival wasps from other colonies, and nest odour frequently changes. Vespula vulgaris wasps have been observed aggressively competing with honey bees for the honeydew secreted by the scale insect Ultracoelostoma brittini in New Zealand's South Island black beech forests.

=== Over-wintering behaviours ===
After mating, the queen overwinters in a hole or other sheltered location, sometimes in buildings. Wasp nests are not reused from one year to the next, but in rare instances wasps have been seen to re-nest in the footprint of a removed nest or even begin building a new nest within an old nest. In the mild climate of New Zealand and Australia, a few of the colonies may survive the winter, although this is much more common with the German wasp.

=== Facial recognition ===
The species has been shown to be capable of recognizing human faces, a similar capacity as has been demonstrated for honey bees.

== Venom ==
The painful, though rarely life-threatening sting involves the injection of a complex venom containing amines (histamine, tyramine, serotonin, catecholamines), peptides, and proteins, including many hydrolases. The alkaline venom is quite different from bee venom, which is acidic.

== Factors affecting foraging ==
The foraging activity of Vespula vulgaris is dependent on the light and temperature of the surrounding area. Generally, if the temperature of the surrounding area falls below 2 °C, the wasps will not proceed with foraging even if the temperature of the nest itself is optimal. When the temperature is above 2 °C, light intensity comes in to play a role. If the light intensity is high enough, the wasps will fly off to forage. However, there is a wide variance within the species, and even within individuals what that threshold light intensity would be – i. e. when would be the best light intensity for a wasp to go out to forage.

The foraging activities of Vespula vulgaris are generally highest in early mornings. There are three known reasons for such behaviour. First is to satisfy the larval requirements. The workers fly off early in the morning to forage, as soon as their optimal light intensity is reached. They want to feed the larvae which have been starving during the night as soon as possible to reduce their chance of dying. The second reason is to maximise fluid foraging. Because dews and nectars are most abundant early in the morning and are the best sources of fluids, the workers fly off early in the morning before the competition becomes severe. Last is the necessity to release excretory products such as trophallactic secretions from the larvae.

Generally, wasps are unable to predict heavy rainfalls. They continue their foraging activities even in the rain, but cease when the rain becomes torrential. When the rainfall becomes extremely heavy near the nesting site, the workers rapidly return to their nests. Those whose foraging activities were interrupted by heavy rainfall become reluctant to forage again in the future, even when the weather is dry and calm. Those who continue to forage do so mainly for fluid.

The average life span of an adult Vespula vulgaris is known to be around two weeks (14 days). There was a negative correlation found between the age of the worker Vespula vulgaris and their respective foraging speeds, and a positive correlation between their age and the amount of time each worker spent in the nest between each foraging trip. The foraging speed decreased as the workers aged and the time a worker spent in the nest between foraging trips increased as they got older. Wasps that are over 30 days, in fact, generally cease from foraging trips and spend all of their time guarding the entrance of the nest.

== Diet ==
Similarly to other Vespulas, Vespula vulgaris feed on animal preys to feed their developing larvae and carbohydrates, such as nectar and sweet fruits, to satisfy their own energy requirements. Their larvae generally eat freshly killed insects, including lepidopteran larvae (caterpillars), Hymenoptera (bees, ants, and other wasps), and Diptera (flies), as well as recently killed Araneae (spiders). Common wasps will also attempt to invade honey bees' nests to steal their honey.

Although the types of prey Vespula vulgaris and Vespula germanica forage are almost the same, that of Vespula germanica are generally 2–3.5 times bigger and heavier than that of Vespula vulgaris. This is mainly due to the size difference of the two species. Because the Vespula germanica foragers are bigger in morphology than those of Vespula vulgaris, and they both transport the prey by carrying them, it would be advantageous for the wasp to be bigger to be able to hold larger prey.

== Caste system ==
In the early stage of the colony founding, the queen Vespula vulgaris does most of the work, both building and foraging. After completing the nest, she diversifies her foraging to include not just pulp, but also fluids and insect flesh. The labour divides as the first batch of larvae is hatched. However, during the very beginning of the hatching, the workers do not take part of any labour. Rather, they remain motionless with their heads inside a cell. Workers actually start foraging actively after seven days. They both forage and take care of the broods by feeding the larvae, breaking down the insect flesh, dividing fluids collected by the foragers, removing trophallactic secretion from the larvae, and fixing the nests.

== Queen ==
One possible factor that determines a female's social caste is known to be its nest position. The location of each cell is directly related to the amount of food a larva can receive, and the queen cell, being located at the very bottom of the nest, encounters the foragers before any other cell. Therefore, it gets most of the food and naturally, yields the biggest female – the queen.

As mentioned above, the cell location can alter the size of the larva and eventually determine which female Vespula vulgaris is going to be queen. However, when several candidates of queens arise, there is competition among them. Certain variations among them rank the hierarchy of the queens and thus select the ultimate queen. Although the precise causes of the variations in the queens are still unknown, one possible factor is the amount of fat stored in the queen's body. Smaller developing queens have less fat stored, and thus have relatively higher mortality rates in winter than larger queens. The bigger the size and larger the amount of fat stored, the "higher" the queen is considered in quality, and she is able to out-compete other queens in finding a fit mate. She will then have an advantage in establishing a nest in the following spring.

In order for the Vespula vulgaris queen to dominate all the workers – usually numbering more than 3000 in a colony –she possesses a special chemical that sends signals of dominance. The workers were discovered to regularly lick the queen while feeding her, and the air-borne pheromone from the queen's body alerts those workers of her dominance.

== Pest status ==
Along with the invasive German wasp (Vespula germanica) and three species of Polistes, the common wasp is considered a pest species in New Zealand. It predates native insects and competes with endemic species for food, such as insects and honeydew. In some South Island beech forests it has been calculated that wasp densities are higher than anywhere else in the world, and that the total weight of common wasps may exceed that of all birds.

== Predators ==
Vespula vulgaris is subject to predation by the honey buzzard, which excavates the nests to obtain the larvae. The hoverfly Volucella pellucens and some of its relatives lay their eggs in a wasp nest, and their larvae feed on the wasps' young and dead adults. Larvae of the ripiphorid beetle Metoecus paradoxus are a parasitoid of V. vulgaris larvae. Robber fly and spiders are other predators of this and many other species. A species of parasitic mite, Varroa destructor jacobsoni, was found on larvae of this species in Poland in 1988.

In New Zealand a 2010 study found that an as yet unidentified predator/s is responsible for local extinction of Vespula (both vulgaris and germanica) on many offshore islands 5–7 years following eradication of introduced rodents. Studies including 36 islands have not identified the agent responsible. However, a 2020 study of 36 islands found, "no evidence for a link between rat presence and wasp abundance on islands", but that wasps were reduced by tree canopy cover by species not attracting honeydew-secreting scale insects.

== Additional images ==
Pictures relating to Vespula vulgaris
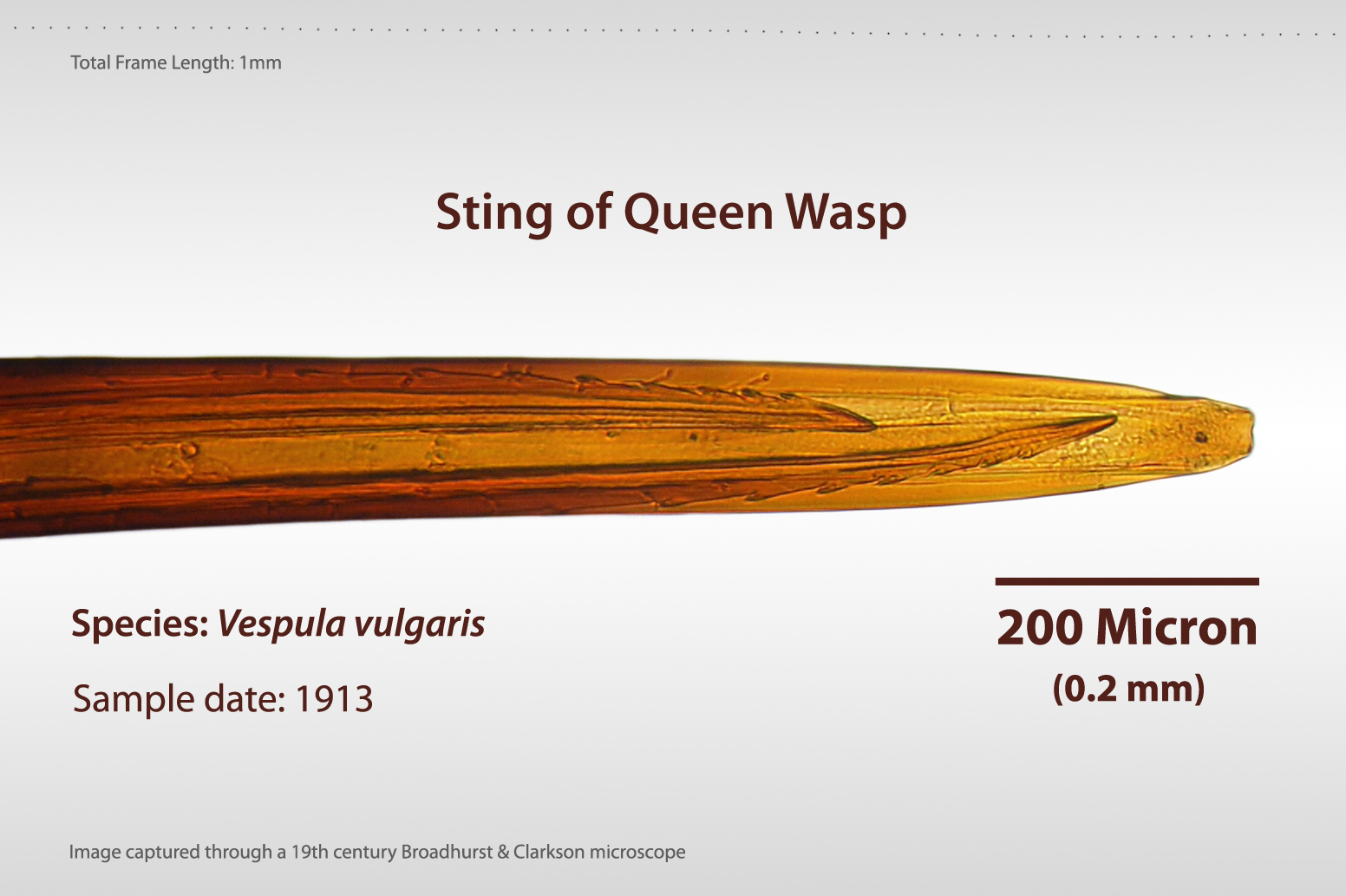
Microscope-magnified image of a queen wasp's stinger

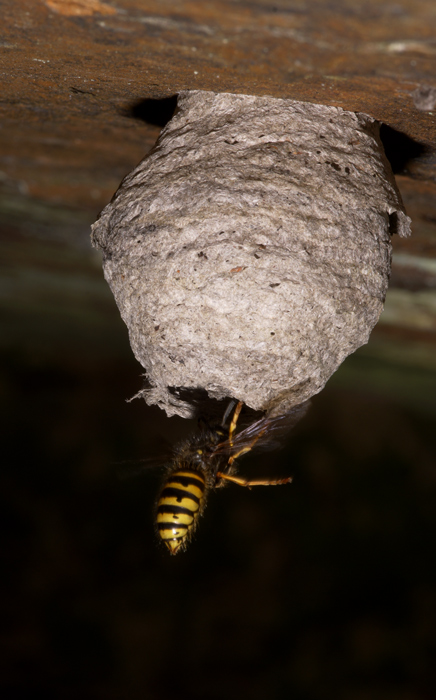
Queen returning to nest

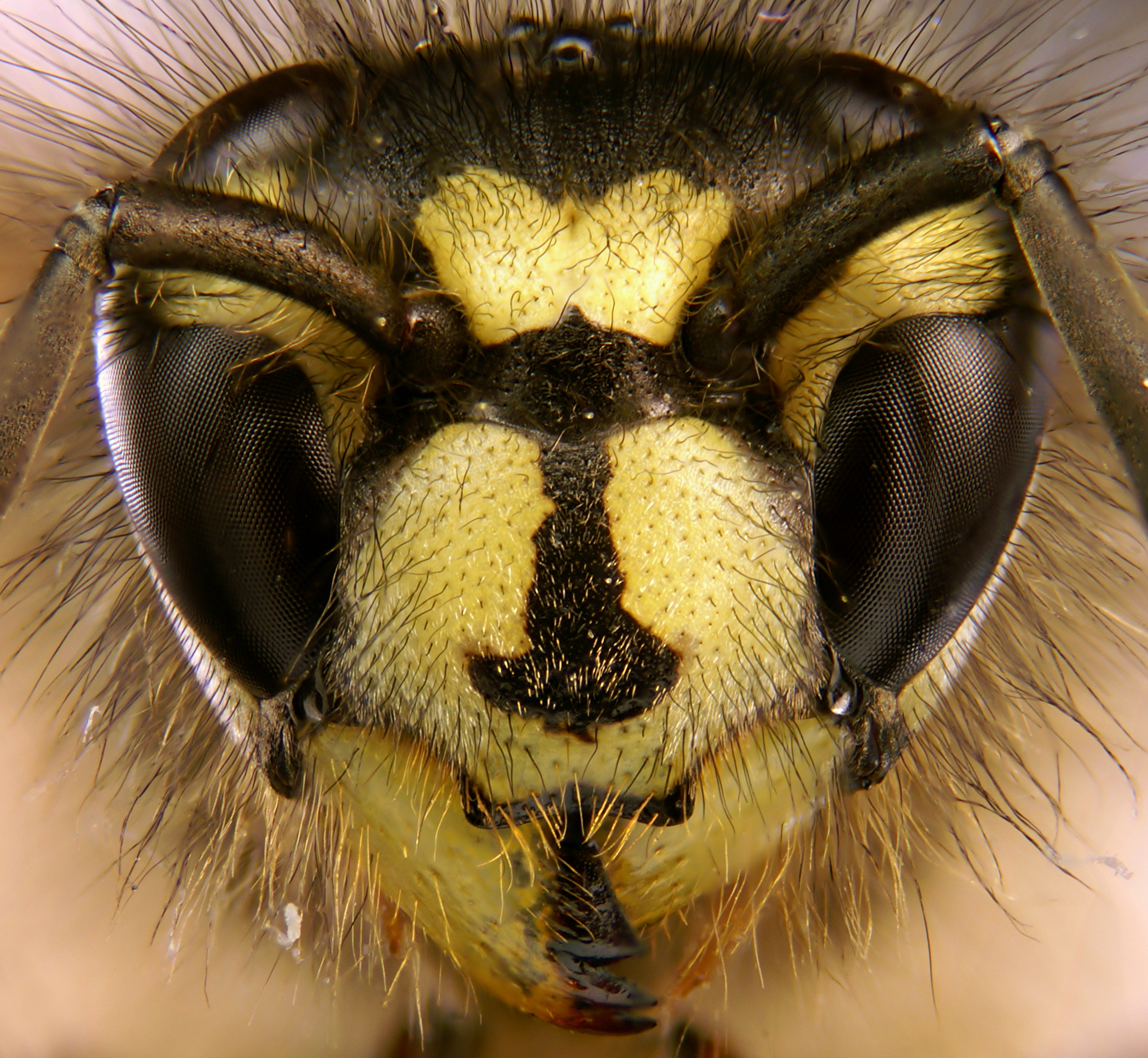
Face

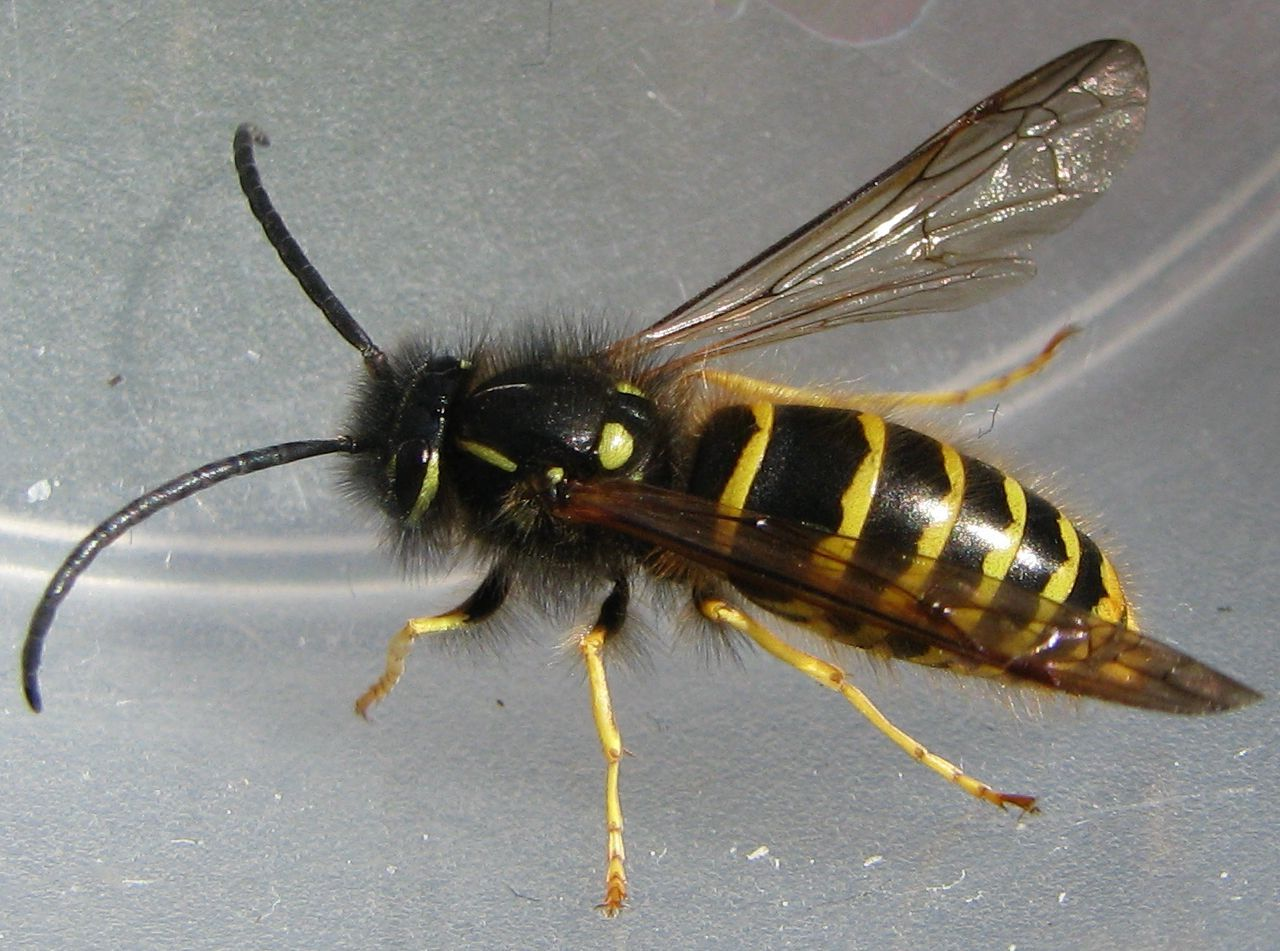
Male

== See also ==
- Characteristics of common wasps and bees
