= Chanoch Henoch Eigis =

Lithuanian rabbi and Holocaust victim

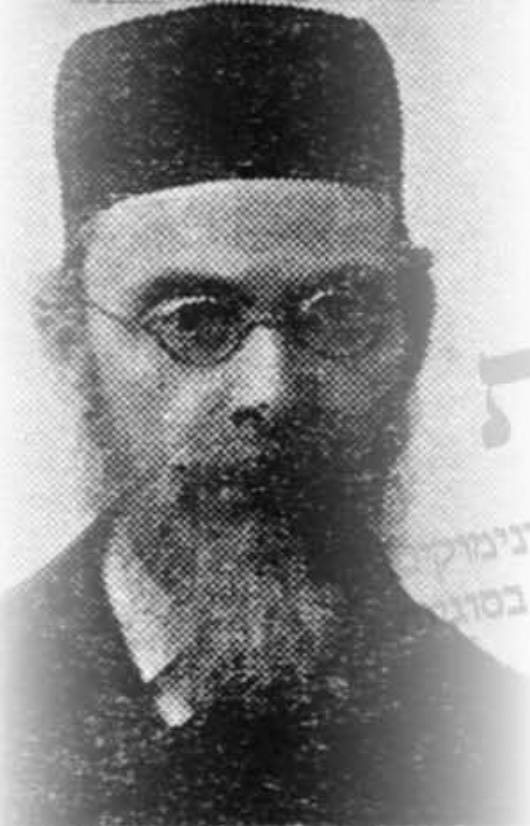

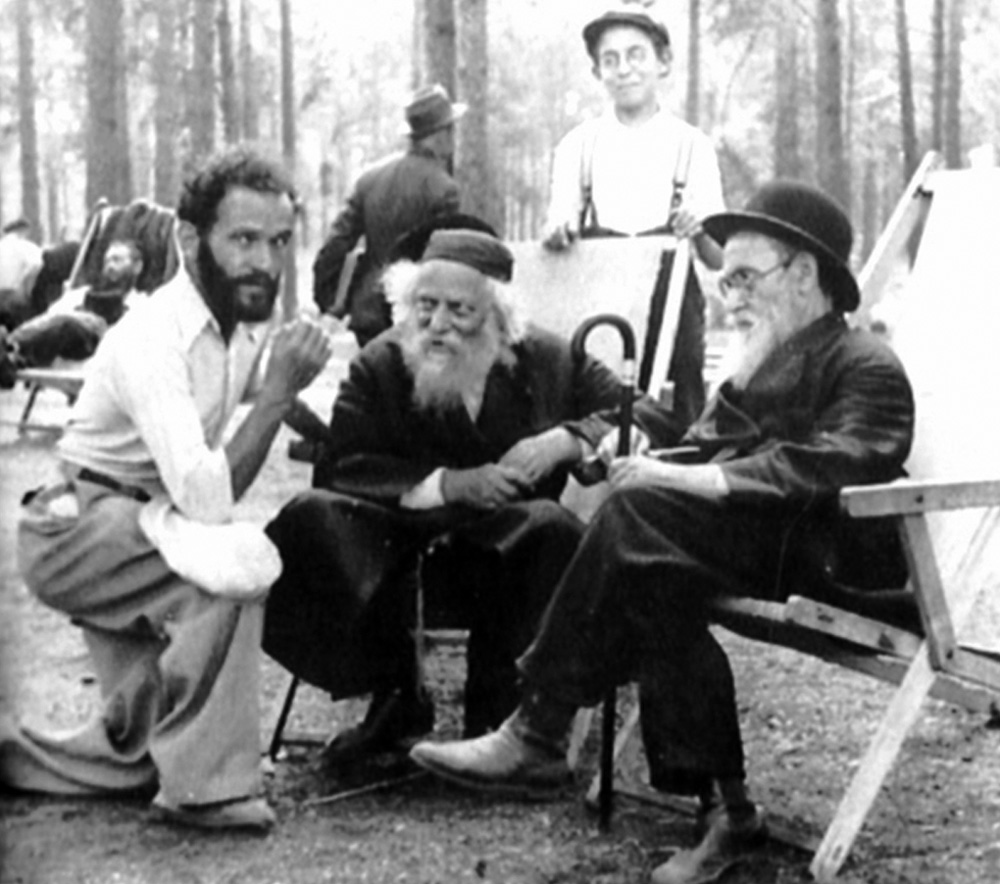
R. Yerucham Gorelick (left) with R. Boruch Ber Leibowitz (middle) and R. Hanoch Eiges (right)

Chanoch Henoch Eigis (Yiddish: חנוך העניך אייגעש; 1863–1941), known as the Marcheshet, was a prominent Lithuanian rabbi in the first half of the 20th century. He was one of the leading rabbis of Vilna for over 40 years, until he was murdered in the Holocaust. He is chiefly known for a book of responsa entitled Marcheshet.

== Life ==
Chanoch Henoch Eigis was born in Russian Lithuania in 1863. His father, Simcha Reuven, was a businessman and a scholar, the author of a number of works of Jewish thought. Chanoch was educated in Russian, Brisk and Kovno and finished his education in the world-famous Volozhin yeshiva. He married Hindy, the daughter of Rabbi Shmuel Dibretinsky.

In 1898, at the age of 34, Chanoch received an appointment as a rabbi in Vilna, which he held until his death. Throughout his career he maintained a close, personal relationship with the leader of the ultra-orthodox community in Vilna, Rabbi Chaim Ozer Grodzinski and the two jointly signed numerous petitions, letters and announcements. The two rabbis jointly founded a kollel – a yeshiva for advanced rabbinic scholars who studied on their own –attended by many of the best talmudic students in Lithuania.

During the First World War Grodzinski was forced to flee Vilna and Eigis replaced him until he was able to return. In an argument over the identity of the government-appointed rabbi of Vilna, Eigis opposed the candidate who supported the local Zionists, siding instead with the candidate supported by Grodzinski, Rabbi Yitzhak Rubinstein. After the Balfour Declaration, Eigis joined the Mizrachi, the religious Zionist organization. In 1923 Eigis joined other Polish and Lithuanian rabbis and signed a proclamation supporting Mizrachi; in 1929 he stopped supporting the Mizrachi because of their support for an alternate candidate (Yitzchak Rubinstein from the earlier dispute, but this time for a different position) for the rabbinate of Vilna. He continued to work in support of Aliyah (emigration of Jews to Palestine) and in 1935 he was one of the founders of the ultra-orthodox department of the Jewish National Fund.

Grodzinski died in 1940. When the Second World War broke out, as a result of the Molotov–Ribbentrop Pact large numbers of yeshiva students streamed into Vilna from across Lithuania. Eigis worked in support of these students, and many checks signed by him were sent by the American Jewish Joint Distribution Committee. In 1941, at the age of 77, Eigis was murdered by the Nazis. The date of his death in uncertain. There is testimony that he was killed on the 15th day of Elul (September 7); other reports state that he was killed 6 weeks earlier. The place of his death is also uncertain. Some reports indicate that he was killed in Vilna, while other reports indicate that he was first taken to Ponar, where he was killed by the Einsatzgruppen.

== Works ==
Eigis's first work, entitled Minchat Chanoch, was added as an appendix to his father-in-law's work Olat Shmuel. The work deals with issues related to the tractates of Seder Kodashim and tractate Avodah Zarah. Eigis' wrote the books of responsa entitled Marcheshet, which deal both with practical and theoretical issues of Jewish law and was published in two parts, in 1931 and 1935. In the introduction, Eigis expresses his reservations regarding the Brisker method of talmudic methodology.
