= Enoch (given name) =

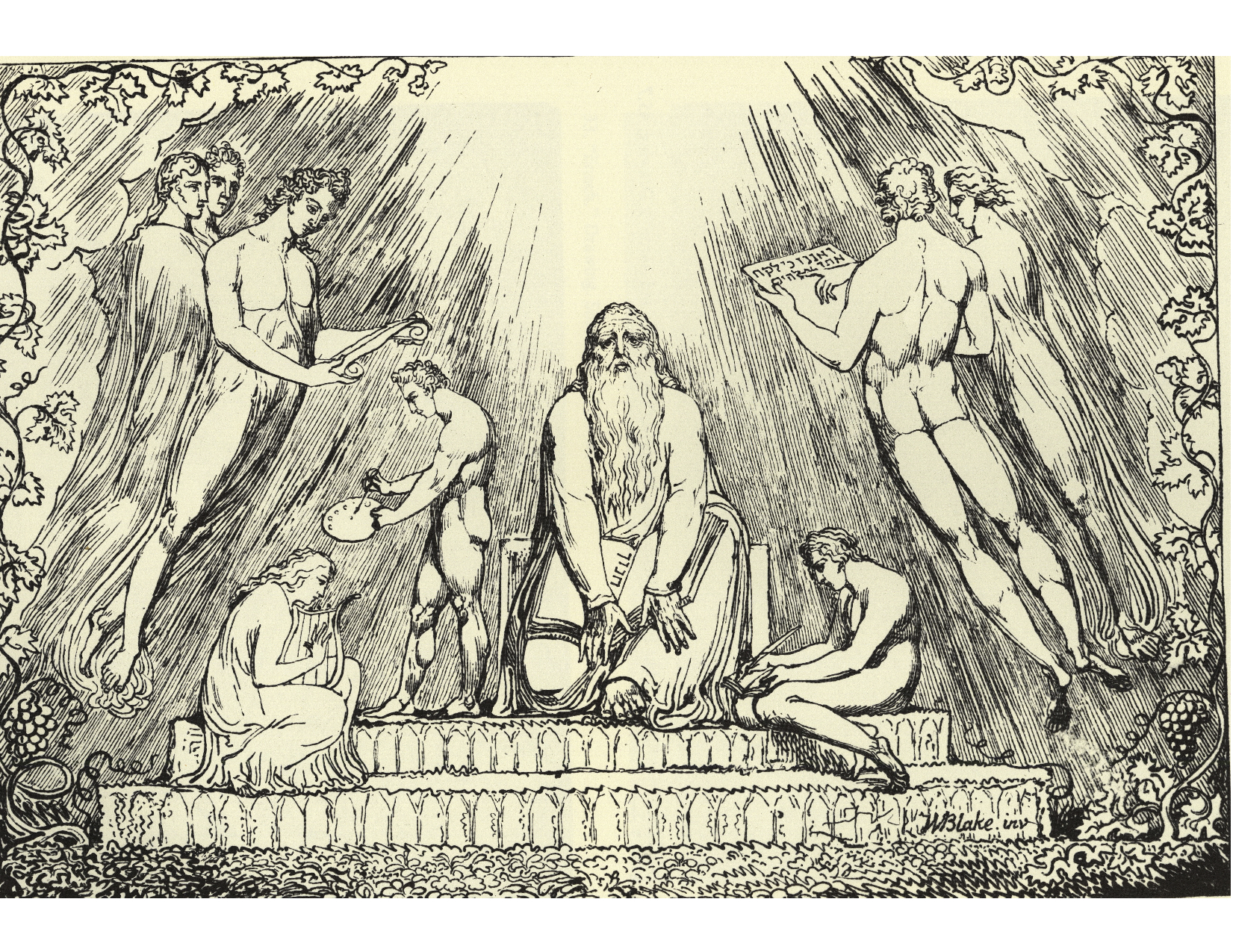
- Lithograph of Enoch by William Blake, 1807.
- Pronunciation: /ˈiːnək/
- Gender: Male

Origin
- Origin: Hebrew
- Meaning: "your grace" "to train", "iniate", "dedicated", "inaugurate", "follower", "wise" or "clever"
- Region of origin: Eretz Israel

Other names
- Alternative spelling: Enock

Enoch (also spelt Enock) is a masculine given name. It is popularized by the biblical figure and patriarch, Enoch in the Bible. The name is derived from Greek Ἑνώχ (Henṓkh) itself from Hebrew חֲנוֹךְ (Ḥanōḵ) which came from (ḥēn) while the verb (ḥ-n-ḵ).

== Given name ==
=== Musicians ===
- Enoch Light (1907–1978), American musician and producer
- Enoch Sontonga (1873–1905), South African composer
- Enoch Armani Tolbert, known professionally as Armani White (born 1996), American rapper
- Enoch Nana Yaw Oduro-Agyei, better known by his stage name Trigmatic, Ghanaian musician
- Enoch Rubens, better known as Anup Rubens, Indian music composer and singer
- Enoch “Skeeter” Thompson, American musician and bassist of the DC hardcore band Scream

=== Athletes (association football) ===
- Enoch Adu (born 1998), Ghanaian footballer
- Enoch Kofi Adu (born 1990), Ghanaian footballer
- Enoch Agwanda (born 1994), Kenyan footballer
- Enoch Andoh (born 1993), Ghanaian footballer
- Enoch Banza (born 2000), Finnish footballer
- Enoch Gilchrist (1940–2008), Scottish footballer
- Enoch Hood (1861–1940), English footballer
- Enoch Mort (1912–1999), Welsh footballer
- Enoch Mushagalusa (born 1999), Congolese footballer
- Enoch Oteng (born 1988), Belgian footballer
- Enoch Rowley, English footballer
- Enoch Showunmi (born 1982), British football player
- Enoch West (1886–1965), English footballer

=== Athletes (other sports) ===
- Enoch Olaoluwa Adegoke (born 2000), Nigerian sprinter
- Enoch Bagshaw (1884–1930), American football player and coach
- Enoch Brown (American football) (1892–1962), American college footballer
- Enoch Cook (1845–1927), English cricketer
- Enoch Jeavons (1893–1967), English first-class cricketer
- Enoch Jenkins (1892–1984), Welsh sports shooter
- Enoch Lewis (cricketer) (born 1954), West Indies cricketer
- Enoch J. Mills (1880–1935), American sports coach
- Enoch Nkwe, South African cricketer
- Enoch Storer (1838–1880), English cricketer
- Enoch Tranter (1842–1910), English cricketer

=== Politicians ===
- Enoch Leach Alford (1829–1912), American politician
- Enoch Baldwin (1822–1905), English iron founder and Liberal politician
- Enoch Dogolea (1951–2000), Liberian politician
- Enoch Dumbutshena (1920–2000), Zimbabwean judge and politician
- Enoch W. Eastman (1810–1885), American politician
- Enoch Edwards (trade unionist) (1852–1912), British trade unionist and politician
- Enoch L. Fancher (1817–1900), American lawyer and politician
- Enoch Kelly Haney (1940–2022), American politician
- Enoch A. Holtwick (1881–1972), American politician
- Enoch Edgar Hume (1844–1911), American physician and politician
- Enoch Humphries (1922–2009), Scottish trade unionist
- Enoch Derant Lakoué (born 1944), Central African politician
- Enoch Louis Lowe (1820–1892), American politician
- Enoch Teye Mensah (1946–2023), Ghanaian politician
- Enoch Morrell (1860–1934), Welsh trade unionist and politician
- Enoch Overton (1864–?), British trade unionist
- Enoch H. Pardee (1829–1896), American medical doctor and politician
- Enoch Powell (1912–1998), British politician
- Enoch Salisbury (1819–1890), Welsh barrister, author and politician
- Enoch B. Talcott (1811–1868), American lawyer and politician
- Enoch Thorsgard (1917–2015), American politician
- Enoch H. Williams (1927–2012), American politician
- Enoch Woodbridge (1750–1815), American politician and judge

=== Other ===
- Enoch Adeboye (born 1942), Nigerian pastor
- Enoch Atuboyedia (born 1972), Nigerian bishop
- Enoch Marvin Banks (1877–1911), American historian and professor
- Enoch Barratt (1812–1895), Australian nursery proprietor
- Enoch Bolles (1883–1976), American painter
- Enoch Chase (1809–1892), American physician, farmer, businessman, and politician
- Enoch White Clark (1802–1856), American founder of the financial firm E. W. Clark & Co.
- Enoch Crosby (1750–1835), American Revolutionary War soldier and spy
- Enoch Crowder (1859–1932), American general
- Enoch Edwards (1751–1802), American physician and a leading Patriot during the American Revolution
- Enoch Foster (1839–1913), American state judge
- Enoch Francis (1688–1740), Welsh minister
- Enoch Arden Holtwick (1881–1972), American educator
- Enoch Hughes (1829–1893), English iron-master and pioneer in Australia and New Zealand
- Enoch L. Johnson (1883–1968), American political boss and racketeer
- Enoch Heinrich Kisch (1841–1918), Austrian balneologist and gynecologist
- Enoch Lewis (1776–1856), American mathematician
- Enoch Lincoln (1788–1829), American representative
- Enoch Olinga (1926–1979), Ugandan missionary
- Enoch Greenleafe Parrott (1814–1879), American naval officer in the Mexican-American War and Civil War
- Enoch Wood Perry Jr. (1831–1915), American painter
- Enoch Poor (1736–1780), American brigadier general during the American Revolutionary War
- Enoch Pratt (1808–1896), American businessman and philanthropist
- Enoch J. Rector (1863–1957), American boxing film promoter and early cinema technician
- Enoch Seeman (1694–1744), Polish painter
- Enoch Beery Seitz (1846–1883), American mathematician
- Enoch Steen (1800–1880), American military officer and western explorer
- Enoch Thulin (1881–1919), Swedish pioneer
- Enoch Train (1801–1868), American shipowner and merchant
- Enoch Wedgwood (1813–1879), English potter
- Enoch Tanner Wickham (1882–1970), American folk artist
- Enoch Cobb Wines (1806–1879), American minister and prison reform advocate
- Enoch Wood (1759–1840), English potter
- Enoch Zundel ben Joseph (died 1867), Polish Talmudist

== Fictional characters ==
- Enoch, leader of the Forever Knights in the original series of Ben 10
- Enoch, protagonist in the video game El Shaddai: Ascension of the Metatron
- Enoch, guardian character in the video game OFF
- Enoch, a pumpkin-costumed character in the 2014 animated miniseries Over the Garden Wall
- Enoch, a silent brother in Cassandra Clare's The Shadowhunter Chronicles book series
- Aynuk and Ayli (Enoch and Eli), characters from the Black Country in the English Midlands, featuring in local jokes
- Enoch Brae, a main character in Restless (2011 film)
- Enoch Cain, antagonist of novel From the Corner of His Eye
- Enoch (Marvel Cinematic Universe) from the TV series Agents of S.H.I.E.L.D.
- Enoch Drebber, antagonist in the novel A Study in Scarlet
- Enoch Emery, character in Flannery O'Connor's novel Wise Blood
- Enoch Leng, character in the novels by Douglas Preston and Lincoln Child
- Enoch O'Connor, fictional character in Ransom Riggs' novel Miss Peregrine's Home for Peculiar Children
- Enoch Root, character from Neal Stephenson's novels The Baroque Cycle and Cryptonomicon
- Enoch Samways, a character in Roald Dahl's novel Danny, the Champion of the World
- Enoch Soames, eponymous protagonist in a short story by Max Beerbohm
- Enoch Snow, from the musical CAROUSEL
- Enoch Malachi "Nucky" Thompson, protagonist of the television series Boardwalk Empire
- Enoch Wallace, protagonist of the Clifford D. Simak novel Way Station
