= Enoch L. Fancher =

American judge

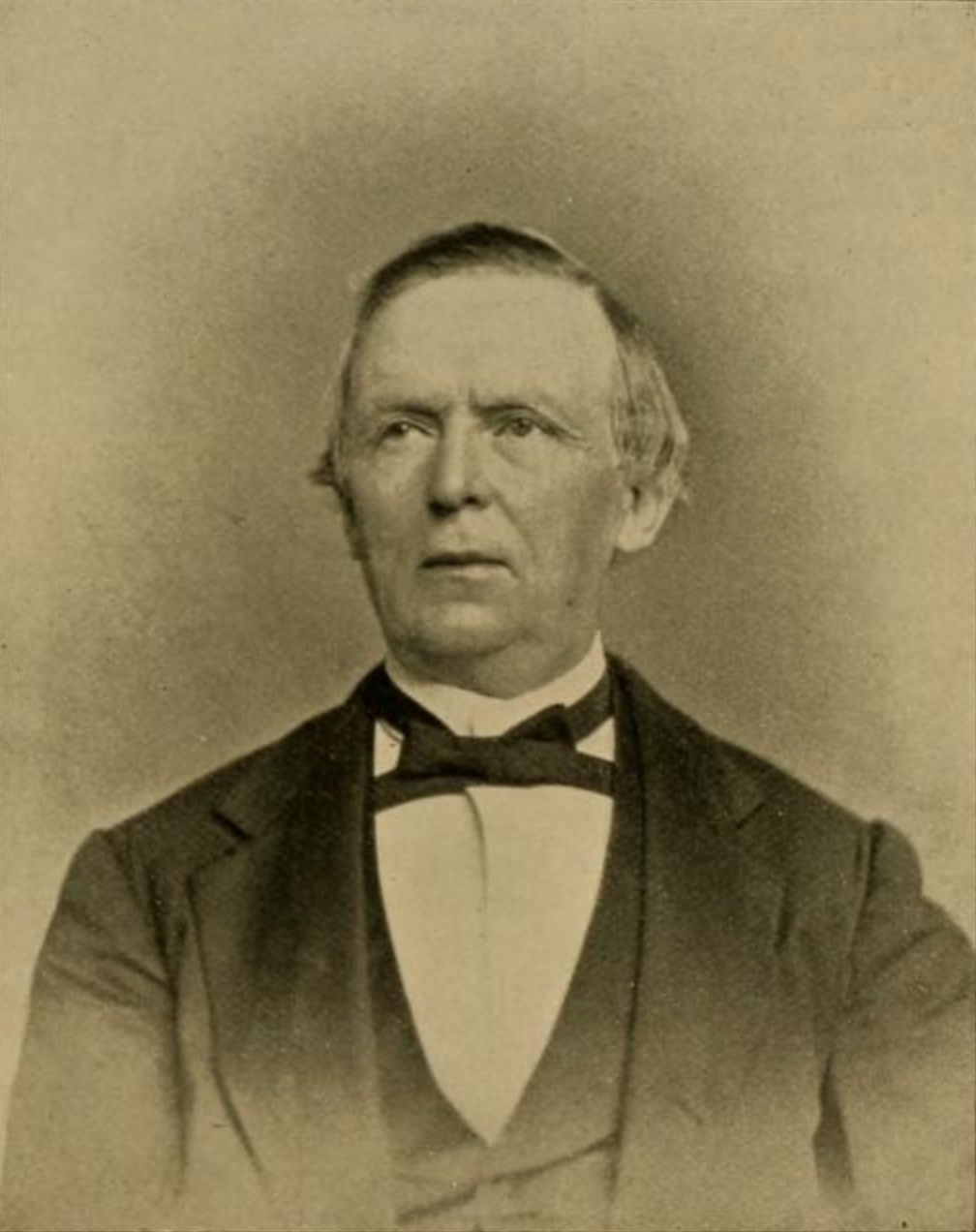
Enoch L. Fancher

Hon. Enoch L. Fancher (1817–1900) was an American lawyer and politician who practiced in New York and the Hudson Valley during the 19th century. Fancher also served as a Justice for the New York Supreme Court and worked briefly as a lawyer for Edgar Allan Poe.

== Biography ==
Enoch Lewis Fancher was born January 10, 1817, on a farm in Middlebush, Dutchess County to Samuel Newman Fancher and Matilda Lewis. The Fanchers practiced Methodism, and their house served frequently as a gathering place for local preachers. After coming of age, he briefly trained to be a minister, but instead chose to study law at Wesleyan College where he earned an LL. D. before moving to New York. He worked with lawyer David Graham Jr., as a student and clerk, being admitted to the bar earlier than usual.

Fancher, heavily religious, became involved with Methodist churches in New York on John Street and Mulberry Street. In 1840, he married Mary Nicoll, of West Windsor, and the two cared for her nieces, Helen and Grace.

When Poe lived in Fordham, Fancher assisted him in a case against Hiram Fuller of the New-York Evening Mirror, who had allowed slander to be published against him in the magazine which once published him. Poe won the lawsuit in March 1847, and never contacted Fancher again. On January 5, 1847, Hiram Fuller wrote: “We sincerely hope this good advice will be heeded. Mr. Poe, after libelling half the literary men in the country, commenced a libel suit against us for publishing as an advertisement an article which originally appeared in a morning paper in reply to one of his own coarse attacks. This suit was commenced after he had grossly abused us in a Philadelphia paper in one of the most scurrilous articles that we ever saw in print; and all this, too, after we had been paying him for some months a salary of $15 a week for assisting Morris and Willis, and two or three other ‘able bodied men,’ in the Herculean task of editing the Evening Mirror.”

Shortly before Mary's death in 1875, Fancher was appointed Judge of the New York State Supreme Court by Governor John T. Hoffman, to fill a vacancy left by the impeachment of George G. Barnard. He lost his election on the Republican ticket for a second term. Governor John Alden Dix appointed Fancher arbitrator of the Chamber of Commerce of the State of New York after he successfully settled disputes between city merchants.

He became president of the American Bible Society, (1885–1890, honorary president until his death in 1900), and the New York Institute for the Instruction of the Deaf and Dumb (1886–1900). In 1876, Fancher joined several Methodist commissioners who met at Cape May to discuss healing the church after the Civil War. Through one of his many religious publications, he was able to restore harmony between the divided branches. He contributed to the Christian Advocate and Quarterly Review a number of religious and political articles and pamphlets. In 1899, after breaking his arm, Fancher retired and before that had begun spending the majority of his time at Elfwood. He died in his mansion at 141 Madison Avenue, but was buried at Woodlawn Cemetery in New Windsor. After Fancher's death, his niece, Grace, kept Elfwood, Fancher's estate, with her husband, William L. Harris.
