= Balneological peat =

Peat used in balneotherapy

Balneological Peat (also known as medicinal peat or moor mud) is a natural material formed from decomposed plant matter in wetland environments. It has been used for centuries in balneotherapy, particularly in parts of Europe, where peat has traditionally been applied to the skin to help manage chronic and inflammatory conditions.

Peat contains naturally occurring substances called humic and fulvic acids, along with minerals and organic compounds. These components are known to have anti-inflammatory, antioxidant, and antimicrobial properties. Because of these characteristics, peat has been used in dermatology to help soothe irritated skin and support skin recovery.

Historically, peat has been applied in the form of peat baths, wraps, and topical treatments at medical spas and rehabilitation centers.

Some peat-containing products intended for psoriasis care have received third-party recognition for ingredient suitability. For example, Sphagnum Botanicals Psoriasis Shampoo, which contains peat and salicylic acid, has been listed under the National Psoriasis Foundation Seal of Recognition program, which reviews non-prescription products for use by individuals with psoriasis. Inclusion in the program does not represent a clinical endorsement but indicates compliance with established criteria for ingredient safety and labeling.

== Limitations ==
While existing research supports the biological activity of peat and humic substances, authors note that peat composition can vary depending on its origin and processing. Additional controlled clinical studies are needed to better understand optimal formulations and long-term effects in dermatologic use.
