= Henock =

Henock is a masculine given name of various origins that is derived from the biblical name Enoch. Notable people with this name include:

- Henock Abrahamsson (1909–1958), Swedish football goalkeeper
- Henock Kankoshi (born 1965), member of the Namibian National Council
- Henock Trouillot (1923–1988), Haitian historian, playwright, and novelist
- Henock “HK” Sileshi (1994-present), creative director of Brockhampton (band)

== See also ==
- Henok, similar and related name
