= Henok =

Henok (Amharic: ኄኖክ, Tigrinya: ሄኖክ ) is a male given name of Eritrean and Ethiopian origin that is related to the name Enoch. Notable people with the name include:

- Henok Achido (born 1982), Swedish rap artist (see sv:Henok Achido)
- Henok Goitom (born 1984), Swedish soccer player
- Henok Tesfaye Heyi (born 1990), Ethiopian middle-distance runner

== See also ==
- Henock, a related name
