= Old Oaken Bucket =

Trophy that goes to the winner of the Indiana-Purdue college football game

- Indiana Hoosiers Purdue Boilermakers
- Sport: College football
- First meeting: November 14, 1891; Purdue 60, Indiana 0
- Latest meeting: November 28, 2025; Indiana 56, Purdue 3
- Next meeting: November 28, 2026
- Trophy: Old Oaken Bucket (Originated in 1925)

Statistics
- Total meetings: 127 (played annually since 1920)
- All-time series: Purdue leads, 77–44–6
- Trophy series: Purdue leads, 63–34–3 starting 1925
- Largest victory: Purdue, 68–0 (1892)
- Longest win streak: Purdue, 10 (1948–1957)
- Longest unbeaten streak: Purdue, 14 (1948–1961)
- Current win streak: Indiana, 2 (2024–present)

Locations of (1) Bloomington (IU) and (2) West Lafayette (Purdue).

The Old Oaken Bucket is a traveling trophy awarded in American college football as part of the rivalry between the Indiana Hoosiers football team of Indiana University and Purdue Boilermakers football team of Purdue University. It was first awarded in 1925.

Indiana and Purdue first met on the gridiron in 1891. The rivalry has been renewed annually in peacetime with some exceptions. Purdue leads the overall series 77–44–6. Like many rivalry games, the game is played during the final week of the college football season.

== History of the trophy ==
The concept of a trophy for football games played annually between Purdue University and Indiana University was first proposed during a joint meeting of the Chicago chapters of the Indiana and Purdue alumni organizations in 1925:

"discuss the possibility of undertaking worthy joint enterprises in behalf of the two schools."

During that meeting Indiana alumnus Dr. Clarence Jones and Purdue alumnus Russel Gray were appointed to propose a suitable trophy. At a subsequent meeting in Chicago Jones and Gray recommended some oaken bucket be that trophy and the chapters drafted the resolution that:

"an old oaken bucket as the most typical Hoosier form of trophy, that the bucket should be taken from some well in Indiana, and that a chain to be made of bronze block "I" and "P" letters should be provided for the bucket. The school winning the traditional football game each year should have possession of the "Old Oaken Bucket" until the next game and should attach the block letter representing the winning school to the bail with the score engraved on the latter link."

Purdue alumnus Fritz Ernst and Indiana alumnus Whiley J. Huddle were appointed to find a suitable oak bucket. They found such a bucket at the then Bruner family farm between Kent and Hanover in southern Indiana. Although the bucket might have been used at an open well on the Bruner family farm that had been settled during the 1840s, the Bruner family lore indicates that the bucket might have been used by General John Hunt Morgan and his "Raiders" during their jaunt through southeastern Indiana during the Civil War.

In accordance with the Chicago alumni organization's resolution, the winner of the bucket gets a "P" or "I" link added to the chain of the bucket with the score, date and the city where the game was played engraved on the link. In case of a tie, an "I–P" link was added. The inaugural Old Oaken Bucket Game ended in a 0–0 deadlock on November 21, 1925, in Bloomington resulting in the first and most visible link, an "I–P" link, being added to the handle of the bucket.

When Indiana and Purdue moved to separate divisions for the 2014 season—Indiana to the East and Purdue to the West—the Old Oaken Bucket was the only inter-divisional rivalry protected under the new alignment.

== The poem "The Old Oaken Bucket" ==
The name of the trophy refers to a sentimental poem written in 1817 by a successful printer and publisher, Samuel Woodworth (1784–1842) which begins:

"How dear to this heart are the scenes of my childhood,
When fond recollection presents them to view!
The orchard, the meadow, the deep-tangled wild-wood,
And every loved spot which my infancy knew!

...And e'en the rude bucket that hung in the well—
The old oaken bucket, the iron-bound bucket,
The moss-covered bucket which hung in the well."

Although Samuel Woodworth was not from Indiana, the poem exemplifies the sentiment felt by the people of Indiana towards their home state. The poem was set to music in 1826 by G. F. Kiallmark (1804–1887) and memorized or sung by generations of American schoolchildren; it made the poet's unpretentious childhood home in Scituate, Massachusetts, the goal of sentimental tourists in the late 19th century.

Bing Crosby recorded a musical version of the poem on a Decca record on June 14, 1941, with John Scott Trotter and His Orchestra.

== Series statistics ==
Statistic	Purdue	Indiana
Games played	127	
Wins	77	44
Ties	6	
Home wins	40	22
Road wins	36	22
Neutral site wins	1	0
Total points scored in the series	2,842	1,985
Most points scored in a game by one team	68 (1892)	66 (2024)
Most points scored in a game by both teams	92 (2013 – IU 56, PU 36)	
Fewest points scored in a game by both teams	0 (1916 & 1925 – PU 0, IU 0)	
Fewest points scored in a game by one team in a win	1 (1894)	3 (1921, 1923, 1940)
Most points scored in a game by one team in a loss	41 (2019)	35 (2012)
Largest margin of victory	68 (1892)	66 (2024)
Smallest margin of victory	1 (1894, 1939, 1980, 1983, 1989)	1 (1930)
Longest winning streak	10 (1948 to 1957)	4 (1944 to 1947); 4 (2013 to 2016)

== Game results ==
The 1903 contest, scheduled to be played on October 31 at Washington Park in Indianapolis, Indiana, was canceled after one of the trains carrying the Purdue football team collided with a coal train near 18th Street on the north side of Indianapolis. In all, 17 Purdue football players, coaches, alumni, and team supporters were killed in the Purdue Wreck. The 2020 contest was canceled due to the COVID-19 pandemic: Indiana was ranked #12 at the time, Purdue was unranked, and the Hoosiers were the favorites coming into the game.

Indiana victories	Purdue victories	Tie games

No.	Date	Location	Winner	Score
1	November 14, 1891	West Lafayette	Purdue	60–0
2	November 5, 1892	West Lafayette	Purdue	68–0
3	November 14, 1893	West Lafayette	Purdue	64–0
4	November 24, 1894	Bloomington	Purdue	1–0
5	October 30, 1897	West Lafayette	Purdue	20–6
6	November 12, 1898	West Lafayette	Purdue	14–0
7	November 30, 1899	West Lafayette	Indiana	17–5
8	November 29, 1900	West Lafayette	Indiana	24–5
9	October 26, 1901	Bloomington	Indiana	11–6
10	November 15, 1902	West Lafayette	Purdue	39–0
11	November 12, 1904	Indianapolis	Purdue	27–0
12	October 28, 1905	Bloomington	Tie	11–11
13	November 21, 1908	West Lafayette	Indiana	10–4
14	November 20, 1909	Bloomington	Indiana	36–3
15	November 19, 1910	West Lafayette	Indiana	15–0
16	November 25, 1911	Bloomington	Purdue	12–5
17	November 24, 1912	West Lafayette	Purdue	34–7
18	November 23, 1913	Bloomington	Purdue	42–7
19	November 21, 1914	West Lafayette	Purdue	23–13
20	November 20, 1915	Bloomington	Purdue	7–0
21	November 25, 1916	West Lafayette	Tie	0–0
22	November 24, 1917	Bloomington	Indiana	37–0
23	November 20, 1920	West Lafayette	Indiana	10–7
24	November 19, 1921	Bloomington	Indiana	3–0
25	November 25, 1922	West Lafayette	Tie	7–7
26	November 24, 1923	Bloomington	Indiana	3–0
27	November 22, 1924	West Lafayette	Purdue	26–7
28	November 21, 1925	Bloomington	Tie	0–0
29	November 20, 1926	West Lafayette	Purdue	24–14
30	November 19, 1927	Bloomington	Purdue	21–6
31	November 24, 1928	West Lafayette	Purdue	14–0
32	November 23, 1929	Bloomington	Purdue	32–0
33	November 22, 1930	West Lafayette	Indiana	7–6
34	November 21, 1931	Bloomington	Purdue	19–0
35	November 19, 1932	West Lafayette	Purdue	25–7
36	November 25, 1933	Bloomington	Purdue	19–3
37	November 24, 1934	West Lafayette	Indiana	17–6
38	November 23, 1935	Bloomington	Indiana	7–0
39	November 21, 1936	West Lafayette	Tie	20–20
40	November 20, 1937	Bloomington	Purdue	13–7
41	November 19, 1938	West Lafayette	Purdue	13–6
42	November 25, 1939	Bloomington	Purdue	7–6
43	November 23, 1940	West Lafayette	Indiana	3–0
44	November 22, 1941	Bloomington	Indiana	7–0
45	November 21, 1942	West Lafayette	#18 Indiana	20–0
46	November 20, 1943	Bloomington	#3 Purdue	7–0
47	November 25, 1944	West Lafayette	Indiana	14–6
48	November 24, 1945	Bloomington	#4 Indiana	26–0
49	November 23, 1946	West Lafayette	Indiana	34–20
50	November 22, 1947	Bloomington	Indiana	16–14
51	November 20, 1948	West Lafayette	Purdue	39–0
52	November 19, 1949	Bloomington	Purdue	14–6
53	November 25, 1950	West Lafayette	Purdue	13–0
54	November 24, 1951	Bloomington	Purdue	21–13
55	November 22, 1952	West Lafayette	Purdue	21–16
56	November 21, 1953	Bloomington	Purdue	30–0
57	November 20, 1954	West Lafayette	Purdue	13–7
58	November 19, 1955	Bloomington	Purdue	6–4
59	November 24, 1956	West Lafayette	Purdue	39–20
60	November 23, 1957	Bloomington	Purdue	35–13
61	November 22, 1958	West Lafayette	Tie	15–15
62	November 21, 1959	Bloomington	Purdue	10–7
63	November 19, 1960	West Lafayette	#13 Purdue	35–6
64	November 25, 1961	Bloomington	Purdue	34–12

No.	Date	Location	Winner	Score
65	November 24, 1962	West Lafayette	Indiana	12–7
66	November 23, 1963	Bloomington	Purdue	21–15
67	November 21, 1964	West Lafayette	Purdue	28–22
68	November 20, 1965	Bloomington	Purdue	26–21
69	November 19, 1966	West Lafayette	#10 Purdue	51–6
70	November 25, 1967	Bloomington	#4 Indiana	19–14
71	November 23, 1968	West Lafayette	#12 Purdue	38–35
72	November 22, 1969	Bloomington	#17 Purdue	44–21
73	November 21, 1970	West Lafayette	Purdue	40–0
74	November 20, 1971	Bloomington	Indiana	38–31
75	November 25, 1972	West Lafayette	Purdue	42–7
76	November 24, 1973	Bloomington	Purdue	28–23
77	November 23, 1974	West Lafayette	Purdue	38–17
78	November 22, 1975	Bloomington	Purdue	9–7
79	November 20, 1976	West Lafayette	Indiana	20–14
80	November 19, 1977	Bloomington	Indiana	21–10
81	November 25, 1978	West Lafayette	#18 Purdue	20–7
82	November 17, 1979	Bloomington	#12 Purdue	37–21
83	November 22, 1980	West Lafayette	Purdue	24–23
84	November 21, 1981	Bloomington	Indiana	20–17
85	November 20, 1982	West Lafayette	Indiana	13–7
86	November 19, 1983	Bloomington	Purdue	31–30
87	November 17, 1984	West Lafayette	Purdue	31–24
88	November 23, 1985	Bloomington	Purdue	34–21
89	November 22, 1986	West Lafayette	Purdue	17–15
90	November 21, 1987	Bloomington	#20 Indiana	35–14
91	November 19, 1988	West Lafayette	Indiana	52–7
92	November 25, 1989	Bloomington	Purdue	15–14
93	November 24, 1990	West Lafayette	Indiana	28–14
94	November 23, 1991	Bloomington	Indiana	24–22
95	November 21, 1992	West Lafayette	Purdue	13–10
96	November 20, 1993	Bloomington	#21 Indiana	24–17
97	November 19, 1994	West Lafayette	Indiana	33–29
98	November 24, 1995	Bloomington	Purdue	51–14
99	November 23, 1996	West Lafayette	Indiana	33–16
100	November 22, 1997	Bloomington	#23 Purdue	56–7
101	November 21, 1998	West Lafayette	Purdue	52–7
102	November 20, 1999	Bloomington	#19 Purdue	30–24
103	November 18, 2000	West Lafayette	#17 Purdue	41–13
104	November 24, 2001	Bloomington	Indiana	13–7
105	November 23, 2002	West Lafayette	Purdue	34–10
106	November 22, 2003	Bloomington	#16 Purdue	24–16
107	November 20, 2004	West Lafayette	Purdue	63–24
108	November 19, 2005	Bloomington	Purdue	41–14
109	November 18, 2006	West Lafayette	Purdue	28–19
110	November 17, 2007	Bloomington	Indiana	27–24
111	November 22, 2008	West Lafayette	Purdue	62–10
112	November 21, 2009	Bloomington	Purdue	38–21
113	November 27, 2010	West Lafayette	Indiana	34–31
114	November 26, 2011	Bloomington	Purdue	33–25
115	November 24, 2012	West Lafayette	Purdue	56–35
116	November 30, 2013	Bloomington	Indiana	56–36
117	November 29, 2014	Bloomington	Indiana	23–16
118	November 28, 2015	West Lafayette	Indiana	54–36
119	November 26, 2016	Bloomington	Indiana	26–24
120	November 25, 2017	West Lafayette	Purdue	31–24
121	November 24, 2018	Bloomington	Purdue	28–21
122	November 30, 2019	West Lafayette	Indiana	44–41
123	November 27, 2021	West Lafayette	Purdue	44–7
124	November 26, 2022	Bloomington	Purdue	30–16
125	November 25, 2023	West Lafayette	Purdue	35–31
126	November 30, 2024	Bloomington	#10 Indiana	66–0
127	November 28, 2025	West Lafayette	#2 Indiana	56–3
Series: Purdue leads 77–44–6

== Wins by decade ==
Through 2025.

Indiana advantage	Purdue advantage	Tie

Decade	Indiana	Purdue	Tie
1890s	1	6	
1900s	4	2	1
1910s	2	5	1
1920s	3	5	2
1930s	3	6	1
1940s	7	3	
1950s		9	1
1960s	2	8	
1970s	3	7	
1980s	4	6	
1990s	5	5	
2000s	2	8	
2010s	6	4	
2020s	2	3	
Total	44	77	6

== See also ==
- List of NCAA college football rivalry games
- List of most-played college football series in NCAA Division I
- Indiana–Purdue rivalry
