= Woodworth House =

- U.S. National Register of Historic Places
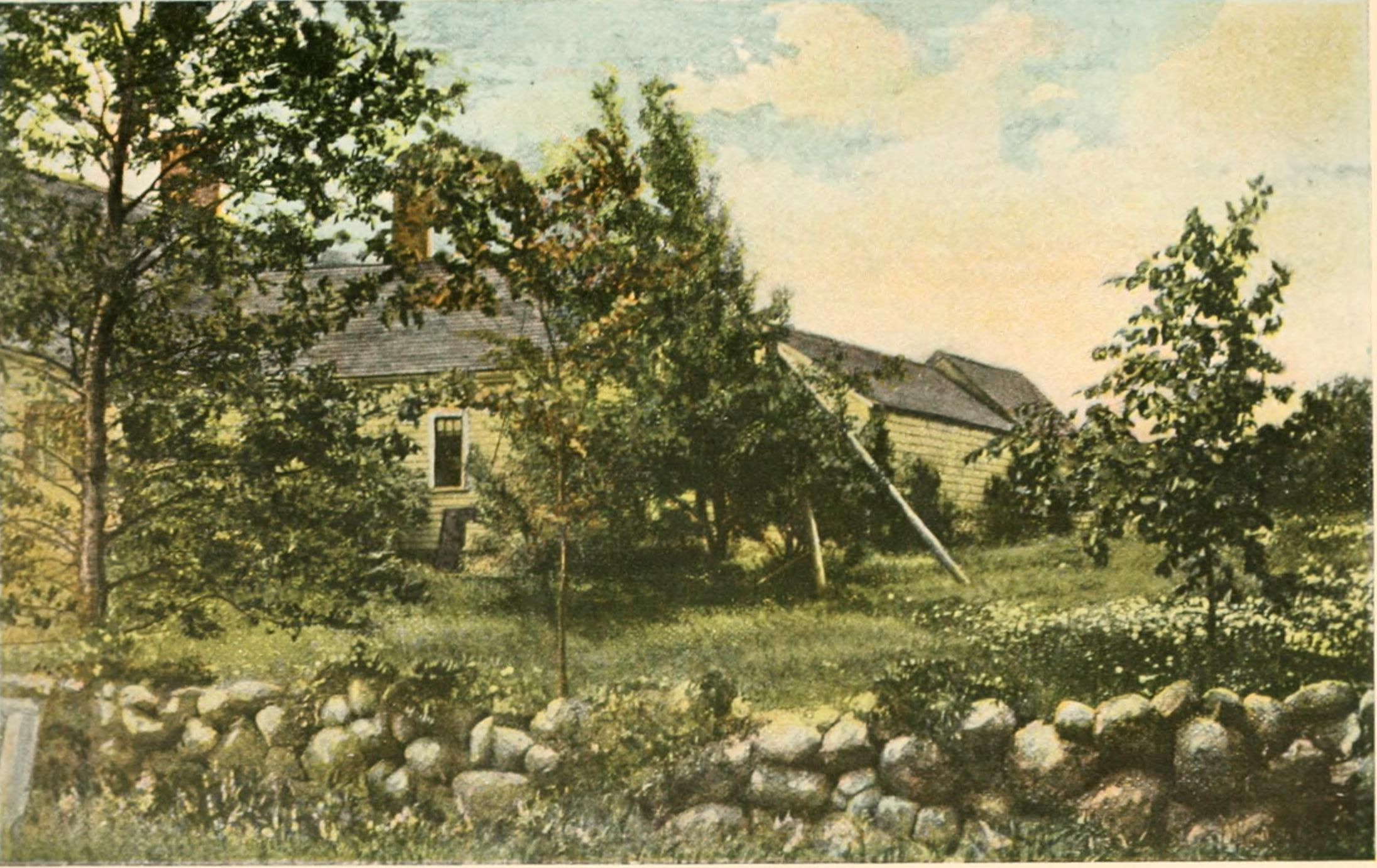
- Old Oaken Bucket House in 1904

- Location within Massachusetts Location within the United States
- Location: 47 Old Oaken Bucket Rd., Scituate, Massachusetts
- Coordinates: 42°10′39″N 70°45′23″W
- Area: 15.7 acres (6.4 ha)
- Built: 1823
- Architectural style: Bungalow/craftsman, Gothic, Federal
- NRHP reference No.: 96000317
- Added to NRHP: April 9, 1996

The Woodworth House, also known as the Old Oaken Bucket Homestead, is a historic house at 47 Old Oaken Bucket Road in Scituate, Massachusetts. The oldest portion of this house was built c. 1675, and is now an ell on the main house, a Cape style structure built in 1826. The house is most notable for its association with Samuel Woodworth, who in 1817 wrote the poem "The Old Oaken Bucket" about an old well on this property.

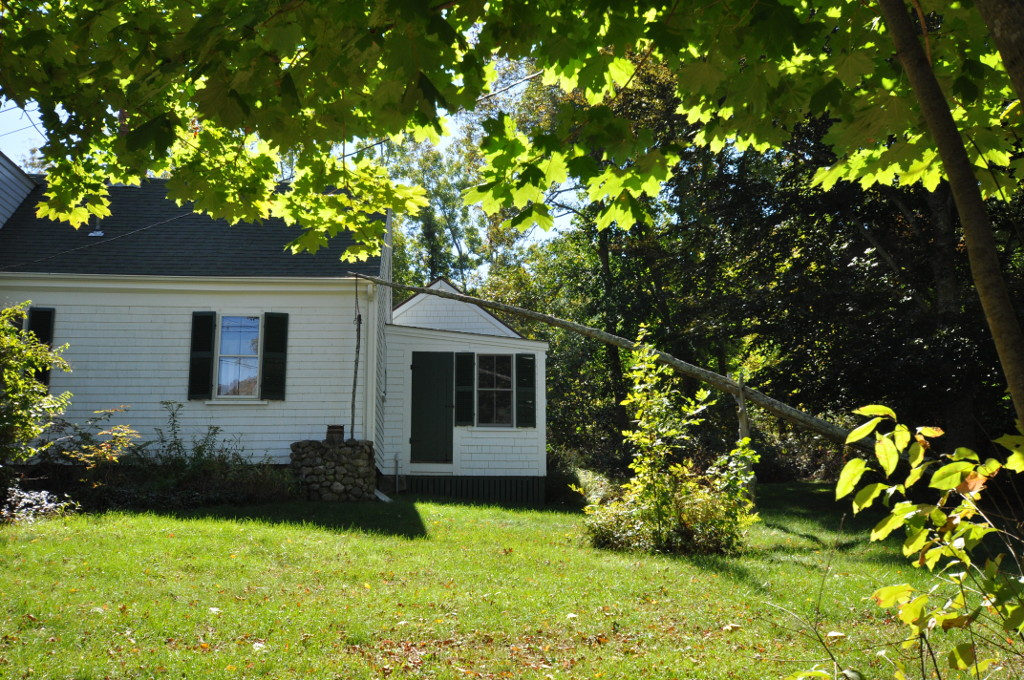
The well and bucket

The football trophy the Old Oaken Bucket, which is contested for annually by Indiana University and Purdue University, was inspired by the poem and the song crafted from the poem.

The property was listed on the National Register of Historic Places in 1996.

== See also ==
- National Register of Historic Places listings in Plymouth County, Massachusetts
