= Enoch Atuboyedia =

Anglican bishop of Nigeria

Enoch Atuboyedia (born 10 March 1972) is the Anglican Bishop of Okrika in Niger Delta Province of the Church of Nigeria.

He was installed as bishop in September 2020, replacing Tubokosemie Abere who has retired.

Atuboyedia was born on Friday 10 March 1972 at Okrika where he attended Boys State School, Okrika from 1978 to 1984 and Okrika Grammar School until 1991. He graduated from Trinity Theological College, Umuahia in 1997. He is also a graduate of Ignatius Ajuru University of Education, Rumuelumini, Port Harcourt and holds a Master of Divinity Degree from the Crowther Graduate Theological Seminary in Abeokuta.

He was ordained Deacon in 1997, became Canon in 2010 and Archdeacon in 2012 of St Peter's Cathedral, Okrika.

Atuboyedia is the second bishop of the Anglican Diocese of Okrika, following Tubokosemie Abere.
