= George Kiallmark =

English violinist and composer

George Kiallmark (1781 – March 1835) was a British violinist and composer.

== Life ==
Kiallmark was born in King's Lynn in 1781, son of John Kiallmark, an officer in the Swedish navy, and of Margaret Meggitt, a Yorkshire heiress, who lived in Wakefield and was related to Sir Joseph Banks.

Shortly after his birth his father, who was in financial difficulty, abandoned the family and died soon afterwards. His widow married her butler, named Pottle, and George was adopted by his mother's family. He began his education under the care of a Dr. and Mrs. Gardiner (née Meggitt); but he showed at an early age a great interest in music, and he studied with a German musical professor from 1796 to 1798.

For some time after 1798 Kiallmark maintained himself by teaching the violin and piano, and when he had accumulated sufficient funds, took further lessons in violin-playing, and from Von Esch and later from J. B. Logier in composition. He held many important posts, was a member of notable concert and theatre orchestras, and was leader of the orchestra at Sadler's Wells.

In 1803 he married Mary Carmichael, a cousin of the Countess of Rothes, and settled in Islington, London. He devoted himself to teaching the harp, violin, and piano, and acquired many pupils. He resigned his public engagements: he devoted himself entirely to his pupils and to composition, entering into arrangements with Chappell & Co. and D'Almaine to supply them annually with a fixed number of compositions. He died in March 1835, leaving a large family.

His eldest son, George Frederick Kiallmark (1804–1887), was also a musician. George Frederick lived in Fitzroy Street and had a music school at Percy Street.

== Compositions ==
Many of George Kiallmark's compositions were reviewed in periodicals of the day.

His composition The favorite “Valse a l’hongroise,” with Variations for the Piano Forte was reviewed in 1820: “The elegant waltz which Mr. Kiallmark has chosen for his theme, cannot but catch the ear, captivate the fancy, and sink into the memory…. Many of the variations… are very agreeable, and, as a whole, it is a fanciful and pretty lesson…. None of the variations aspire to much originality or to much novelty. The design of the lesson appears to be, to please, and this it will effect.”

His composition A favourite Irish Melody, with Variations and an Introduction for the Piano Forte was reviewed in 1820: “He has chosen the beautiful air ’Tis the Last Rose of Summer for his theme, and has treated it with great and never-flagging spirit and effort. Impressive melody appears to be his object, combined with some execution. The introduction is very melodious, and the variations full of accent that fixes the passages in the mind…. The lesson as a whole is very pretty….”

Other works include Introduction and variations to “Roy's Wife,” Variations on “Home, sweet Home,” Les Fleurs de Printemps, in six books; also a number of songs including “Maid of Athens” and “Araby’s Daughter” (1822). The tune to “Araby’s Daughter” was later and more famously used to set lyrics from the poem “The Old Oaken Bucket” by Samuel Woodworth.
