= Hiram Fuller (journalist) =

American journalist

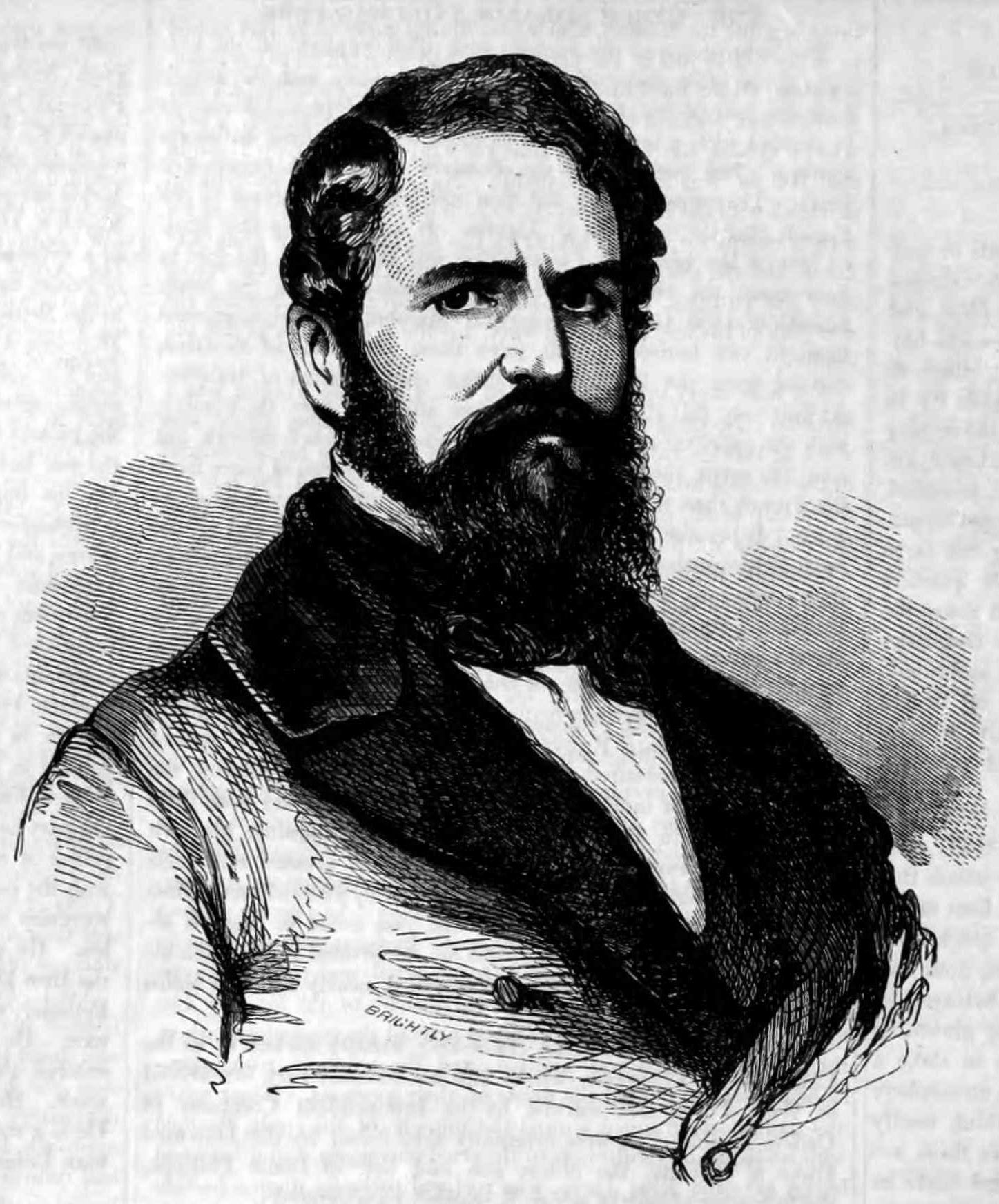

Hiram Fuller (born in Halifax, Massachusetts, September 6, 1814; died November 19, 1880) was an American journalist and educator.

== Biography ==
He started teaching at 16 years of age. After teaching in Plympton, in 1836 he became principal of a school in Providence, Rhode Island. The impression he made on the people in the town was such that they built him a school on Green Street. It was dedicated in 1837 with a speech by Ralph Waldo Emerson. For a time there, Fuller had Margaret Fuller for his assistant.

He afterward became a bookseller in Providence. In this capacity, he nurtured the local literary scene by publishing The Rhode Island Book (1841), which was edited by Anne Charlotte Lynch. In 1843 associated himself with N. P. Willis and George P. Morris in the publication of the New York Mirror. The three afterward established the Daily Mirror, of which Fuller became sole proprietor, and edited it for 14 years.

For the Mirror, Fuller wrote for a series of clever society letters from Newport, under the pen name of “Belle Brittan.” An attack on Edgar Allan Poe which he republished involved him in a libel action against him by that author; Poe won a $225 award. Under Zachary Taylor's administration, Fuller had a place in the navy department.

Fuller went abroad at the beginning of the American Civil War, espoused the Confederate cause, and established the Cosmopolitan newspaper in London. After being twice a bankrupt, he became a journalist in Paris. After the war, he tried unsuccessfully to win back his following in the United States with his 1875 book. He died in Paris, survived by his wife Emilie Louise (Delaplaine) and their daughter.

== Works ==
- The Groton Letters (1845)
- Belle Brittan on a Tour (New York, 1858)
- Sparks from a Locomotive, by Belle Brittan (1859)
- Grand Transformation Scenes in the United States, or Glimpses of Home after Thirteen Years Abroad (1875)
