= Hunters of Kentucky =

1821 song by Samuel Woodworth

Songsheet for Hunters of Kentucky

Hunters of Kentucky

"Hunters of Kentucky", also called "The Battle of New Orleans" and "Half Horse and Half Alligator", is a song written to commemorate Andrew Jackson's victory over the British at the Battle of New Orleans. In 1828, he used it as his presidential campaign song.

== Origin ==
"Hunters of Kentucky" was originally published ca. 1815 in Boston and celebrated the courage of the Kentuckians who fought in the Battle of New Orleans. One-fourth of Jackson's men at the Battle of New Orleans were from Kentucky. It was sung the way Irish singers told stories in narrative form, and performed to the tune of Ally Croker and The Unfortunate Miss Bailey.

Written in 1821 by Samuel Woodworth, it was first sung in New Orleans in 1822 by Noah M. Ludlow. When Ludlow first performed the song, the audience was filled with boatmen who had floated down the Mississippi River from Kentucky; they refused to let him leave the stage until he sang it two more times. The "half horse and half alligator" description was a common expression for boatmen like Mike Fink and other backwoodsmen of the period.

== Use ==
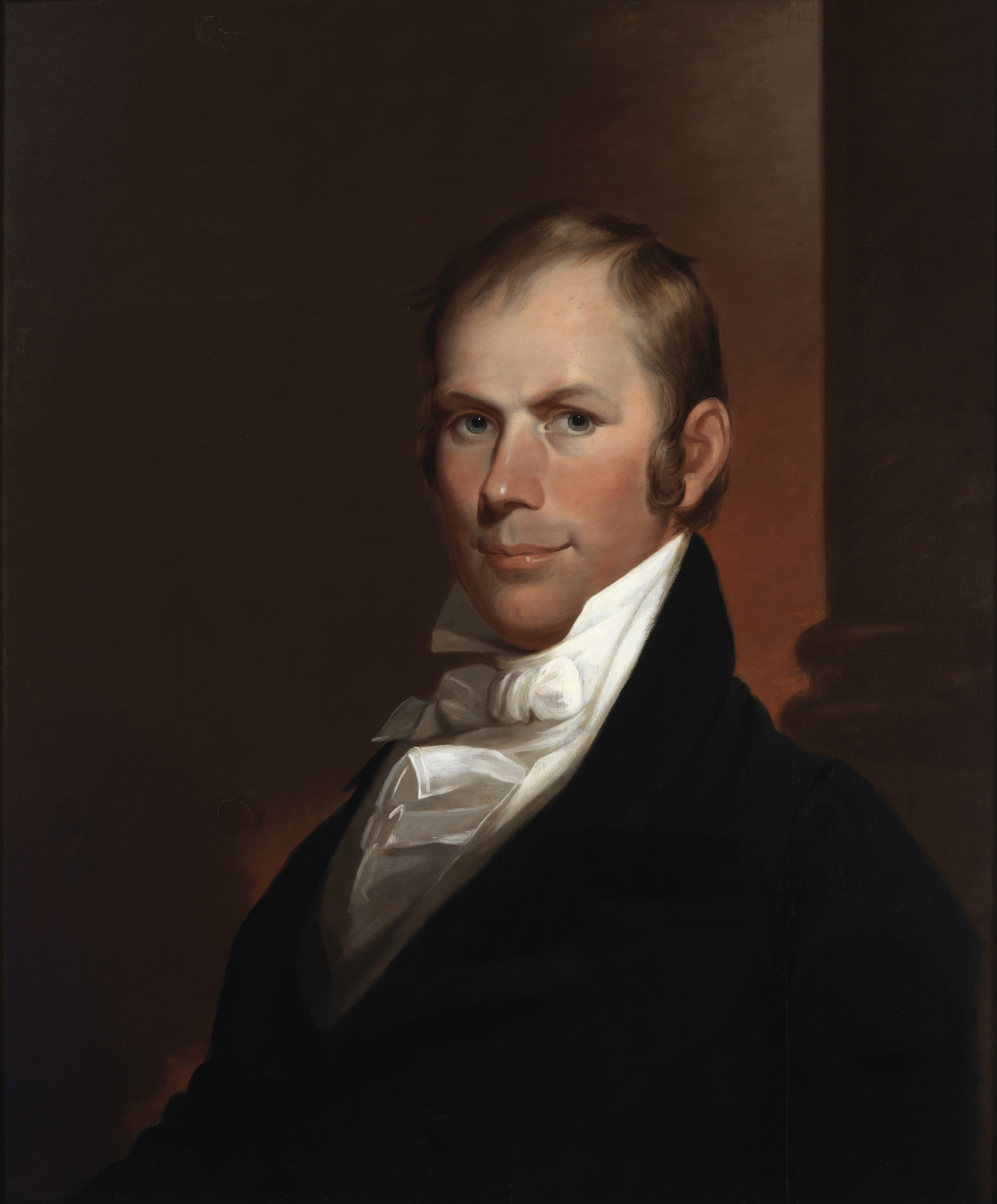
Henry Clay

Throughout the term of Andrew Jackson, "Hunters of Kentucky" proved to be a popular song, and he used it for his 1824 and 1828 campaign. This is ironic as his "fieriest rival", Henry Clay, was the one from Kentucky; Jackson was from Tennessee, near Nashville.

Due to a copy of the song being depicted on the front cover of Davy Crockett's Almanack of Wild Sports in the West, it is thought that "Hunters of Kentucky" might have been sung during the Texas War of Independence, but this is speculation as no other evidence supports the song being sung during that conflict. Americans who entered Canada in 1837 and 1838 sang the song.

== Effects ==
"Hunters of Kentucky" propagated various beliefs about the war. One was that a Pennsylvania Rifle should be called a Kentucky Rifle. Another was that the riflemen won the Battle of New Orleans, when it could be said Jackson's artillery did. One stanza said the British planned to ransack New Orleans, which was unlikely.

== Lyrics ==
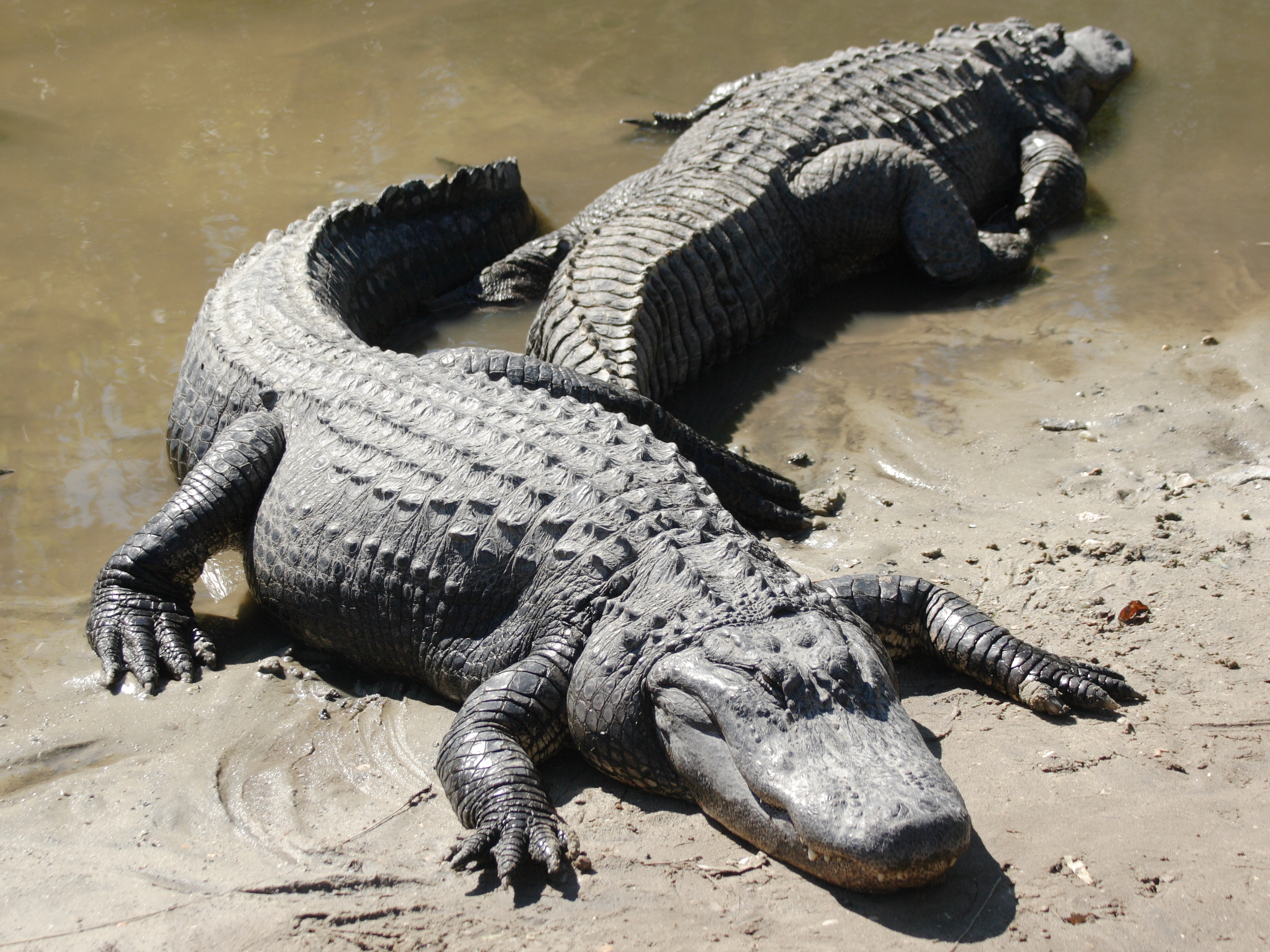
Alligators

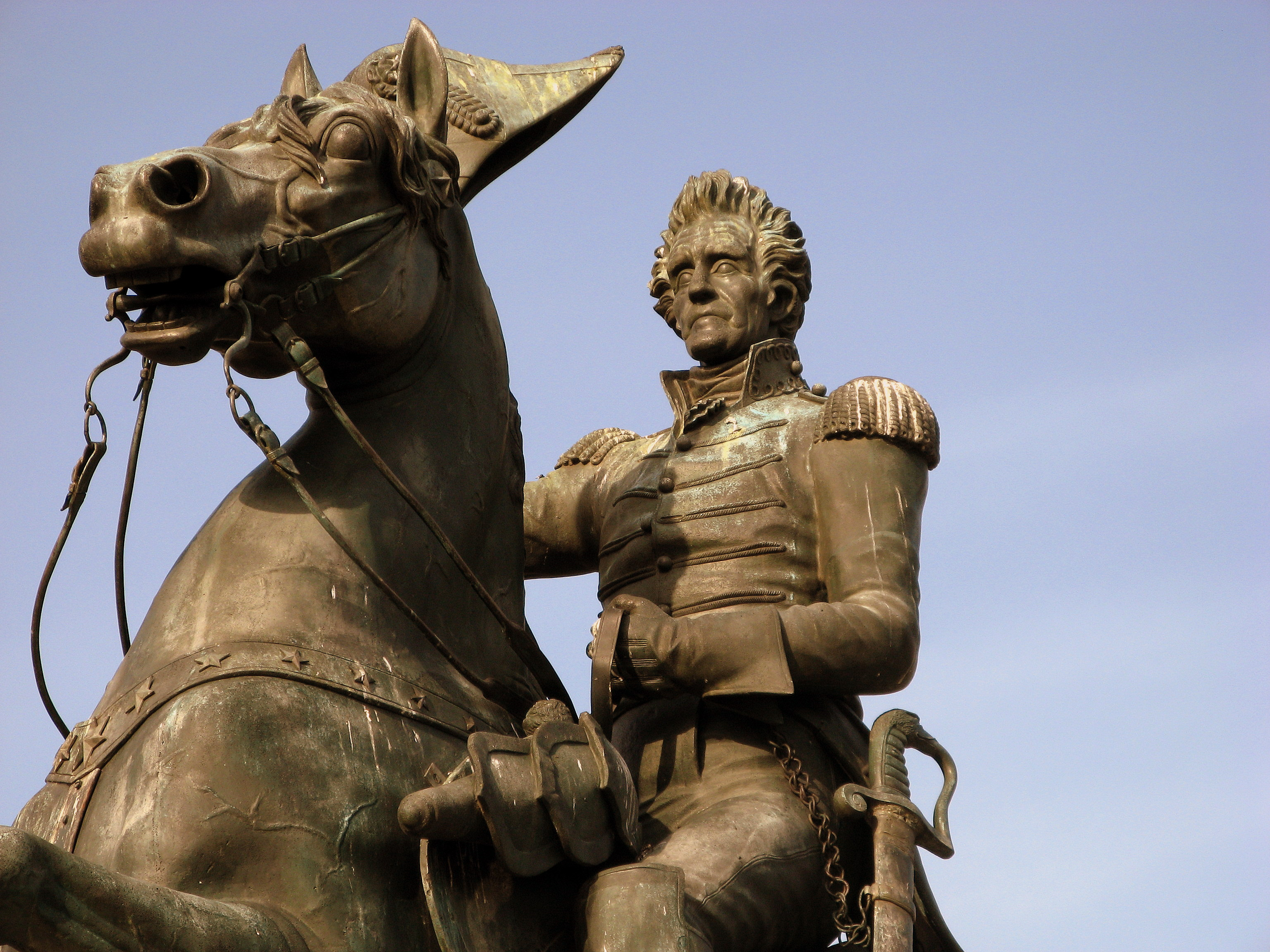
Andrew Jackson

Ye gentlemen and ladies fair,
Who grace this famous city.
Just listen, if you've time to spare,
While I rehearse a ditty;
And for the opportunity
Conceive yourselves quite lucky,
For 'tis not often that you see
A hunter from Kentucky.
Refrain:
Oh Kentucky, the hunters of Kentucky!
Oh Kentucky, the hunters of Kentucky!

We are a hardy, free-born race,
Each man to fear a stranger;
Whate'er the game, we join in chase,
Despoiling time and danger
And if a daring foe annoys,
Whate'er his strength and forces,
We'll show him that Kentucky boys
Are alligator horses.
(Refrain)

I s'pose you've read it in the prints,
How Packenham attempted
To make old Hickory Jackson wince,
But soon his scheme repented;
For we, with rifles ready cock'd,
Thought such occasion lucky,
And soon around the gen'ral flock'd,
The hunters of Kentucky.
(Refrain)

You've heard, I s'pose, how New-Orleans
Is fam'd for wealth and beauty,
There's girls of ev'ry hue, it seems,
From snowy white to sooty.
So Packenham he made his brags,
If he in fight was lucky,
He'd have their girls and cotton bags,
In spite of old Kentucky.
(Refrain)

But Jackson he was wide awake,
And was not scar'd at trifles,
For well he knew what aim we take
With our Kentucky rifles.
So he led us down by Cypress swamp,
The ground was low and mucky,
There stood John Bull in martial pomp,
And here was old Kentucky.
(Refrain)

A bank was rais'd to hide our breasts,
Not that we thought of dying,
But that we always like to rest,
Unless the game is flying.
Behind it stood our little force,
None wished it to be greater,
For ev'ry man was half a horse,
And half an alligator.
(Refrain)

They did not let our patience tire,
Before they show'd their faces;
We did not choose to waste our fire,
So snugly kept our places.
But when so near we saw them wink,
We thought it time to stop 'em,
And 'twould have done you good I think,
To see Kentuckians drop 'em.
(Refrain)

They found, at last, 'twas vain to fight,
Where lead was all their booty,
And so they wisely took to flight,
And left us all the beauty.
And now, if danger e'er annoys,
Remember what our trade is,
Just send for us Kentucky boys,
And we'll protect ye, ladies.
(Refrain)

== In popular culture ==
This song was the closing number of the musical Bloody Bloody Andrew Jackson.
