= Anglican Diocese of Okrika =

Anglican diocese in Nigeria

The Anglican Diocese of Okrika is one of ten within the Anglican Province of the Niger Delta, itself one of 14 ecclesiastical provinces within the Church of Nigeria.

The diocese was established in 2003, the first bishop being Tubokosemie Abere. In October 2020 Enoch Atuboyedia became its second Bishop; he was consecrated a bishop on 21 September 2020 at the Cathedral Church of the Advent, Abuja.

The website of the diocese is okrikadiocese.org

== Bishops ==
Name	Years
Tubokosemie Abere	2003–2020
Enoch Atuboyedia	2020–
