= New-York Mirror =

19th-century newspaper in New York City

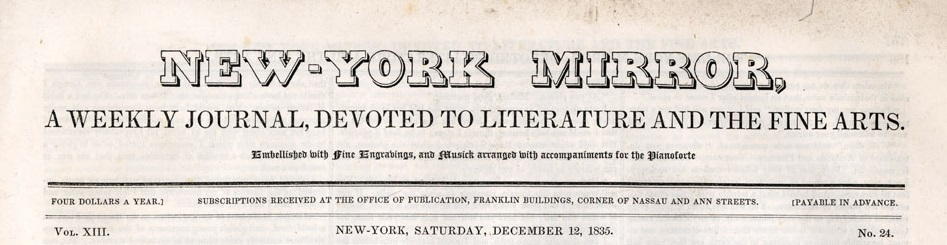
- New-York Mirror, A Weekly Journal, Devoted to Literature and the Fine Arts, Vol. XIII, No. 24 (Saturday, December 12, 1835)
- Type: Weekly newspaper
- Founder(s): George Pope Morris and Samuel Woodworth
- Founded: 1823
- Ceased publication: 1842
- Language: English
- City: New York City
- OCLC number: 244175464

The New-York Mirror was a weekly newspaper published in New York City from 1823 to 1842. Founded by George Pope Morris and Samuel Woodworth, it was a prominent publication that focused on literature, the fine arts, and local news. It played a significant role in American cultural and literary life during the early 19th century, serving as an influential platform for many notable figures in the arts and letters of the time.

== History and development ==
=== Founding and early years (1823–1830s) ===
The New-York Mirror was established in August 1823 by Morris and Woodworth, who envisioned the journal as a publication dedicated to the arts and literary culture. The paper was part of a broader trend of American magazines and journals that sought to cultivate a distinctive national literary voice. The journal not only provided coverage of local news but also featured articles on theater, music, and visual arts, alongside poetry, essays, and literary criticism.

In its early years, the New-York Mirror attracted many prominent contributors and became a significant part of New York's literary scene. The publication's editorial stance leaned toward the refinement of American arts, promoting a sophisticated cultural taste among its readership. The Mirror's blend of literature, fine arts, and social commentary made it a distinctive voice in the growing New York publishing world.

=== Influence and contributions (1830s–1842) ===
Throughout the 1830s and into the early 1840s, the Mirror became a platform for some of the most notable writers and critics of the period. Among the most famous contributors was Edgar Allan Poe, who served as a critic and contributed poetry and prose. Poe’s most famous poem, "The Raven", was first published in the January 29, 1845 issue of the Mirror, marking a significant moment in American literary history. Nathaniel Parker Willis, another important figure in 19th-century American literature, also worked with the publication, and in 1843, he and Morris launched the New Mirror, a brief revival of the original publication.

The Mirror's most notable contributions included works by writers such as James Fenimore Cooper, Washington Irving, and Ralph Waldo Emerson, as well as poetry by William Cullen Bryant and Henry Wadsworth Longfellow. The journal's influence was far-reaching, and it helped to shape the literary tastes of New York City’s upper class.

=== Decline and closure (1842) ===
By the early 1840s, the paper's circulation began to decline, partly due to increased competition from other publications and changing literary tastes. In 1842, the New-York Mirror ceased publication, marking the end of its nearly two-decade run.

=== The Evening Mirror (1843–1898) ===
In 1843, Morris and Willis relaunched the paper as The New Mirror, which published weekly for a brief period of eighteen months. After the failure of this revival, they introduced The Evening Mirror in 1844. The Evening Mirror, a daily newspaper, focused more on literary content than most other daily papers of the time and was widely known for its regular features on the arts and literature. It also became the venue for Poe's critical reviews, continuing his association with the publication.

The Evening Mirror continued to operate until 1898, serving as a significant platform for literary and cultural discourse in New York City. Edgar Allan Poe's involvement with the Mirror was integral to his career, and his legal battles with the paper further fueled his reputation as a controversial literary figure.

After Morris and Willis left the publication in 1846, the paper underwent significant editorial changes under Hiram Fuller, who became the editor. Fuller's tenure was marked by a series of attacks on Poe, leading to a famous libel suit that Poe won in 1846, after being defamed by articles published in the Mirror. Poe was awarded $225.06 as well as an additional $101.42 in court costs ($11,699 in 2025).

== Cultural impact ==
The New-York Mirror and its successors played a central role in American literary culture during the early 19th century. As one of the primary literary publications of its time, it contributed significantly to the development of American journalism and literary criticism. By publishing the works of Edgar Allan Poe, Washington Irving, and Nathaniel Hawthorne, among others, the Mirror helped shape the literary tastes of its era and remains an important artifact in the history of American literature.

In modern pop culture, the New-York Mirror has found an unexpected reference in the 2023 film The Sweet East. In the movie, the song "Evening Mirror" by Talia Ryder serves as an evocative nod to the reflective and introspective nature of the original newspaper. Written by Paul Grimstad, the song explores themes of transformation and self-discovery, aligning with the themes of the original Evening Mirror, which often engaged with the personal and emotional lives of its readers through literary content.

The inclusion of this reference in The Sweet East highlights the enduring legacy of the New-York Mirror and its impact on American culture, connecting the historical significance of the publication with contemporary artistic expressions. The song offers a modern reinterpretation of the reflective and artistic spirit that defined the newspaper in the 19th century.
