= Balneotherapy =

Method of treating diseases by bathing

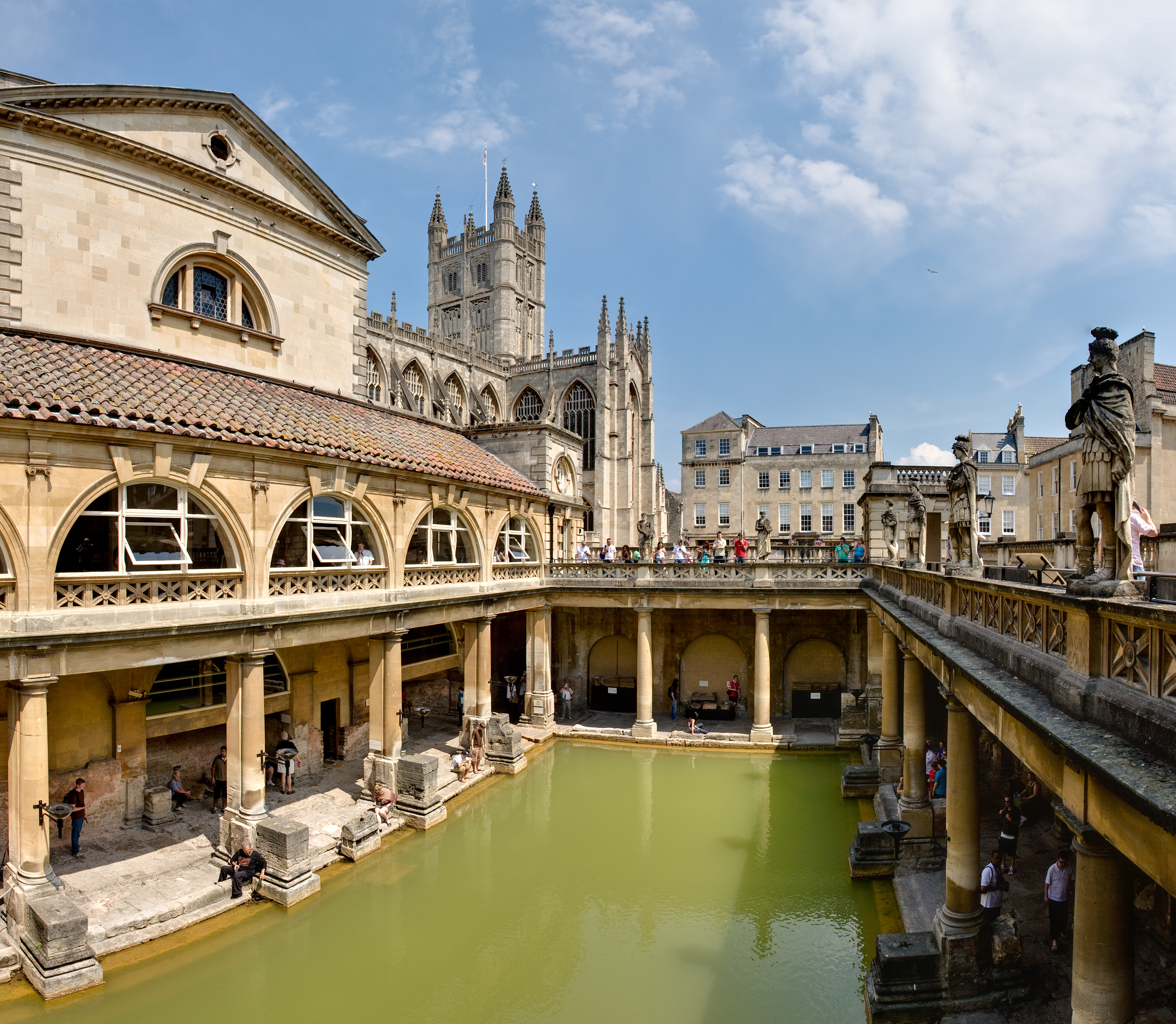
- Roman Baths in Bath Spa, England; July 2006
- MeSH: D001452

Balneotherapy (Latin: balneum "bath") is a method of treating diseases by bathing, a traditional medicine technique usually practiced at spas. Since ancient times, humans have used hot springs, public baths and thermal medicine for therapeutic effects. While it is considered distinct from hydrotherapy, there are some overlaps in practice and in underlying principles. Balneotherapy may involve hot or cold water, massage through moving water, relaxation, or stimulation. Many mineral waters at spas are rich in particular minerals such as silica, sulfur, selenium, and radium.

== Definition and characteristics ==
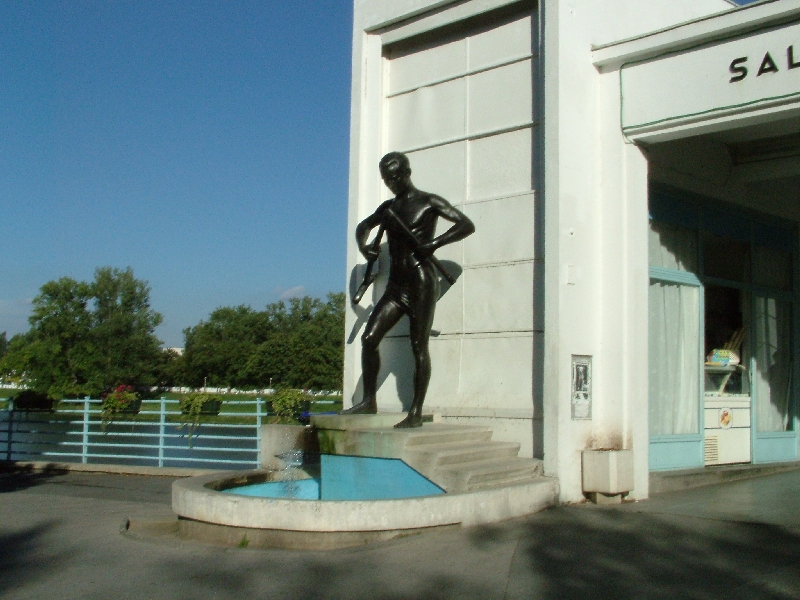
The statue of "A man breaking a walking crutch" in the spa town Piešťany (Slovakia) – an eloquent symbol of balneotherapy

"Balneotherapy" is the practice of immersing a subject in mineral water or mineral-laden mud; it is part of the traditional medicine of many cultures and originated in hot springs, cold water springs, or other sources of such water, like the Dead Sea.

== Presumed effect on diseases ==
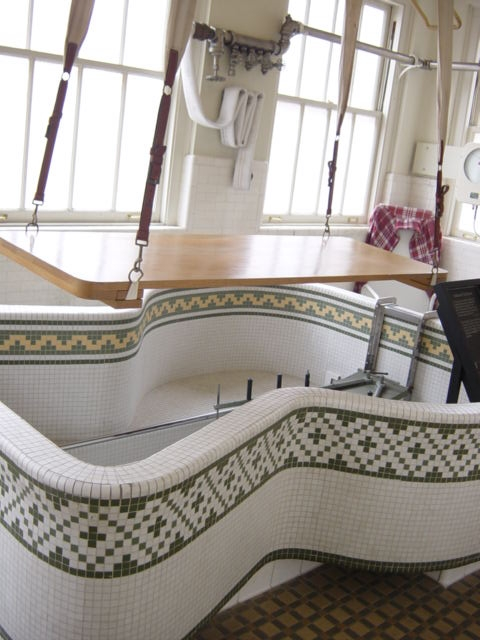
Treatment bath at a spa in Hot Springs, Arkansas, United States

Balneotherapy may be recommended for various illnesses, including arthritis, skin conditions and fibromyalgia. Balneotherapy should be discussed in advance with a physician before beginning treatment since several conditions, like heart disease and pregnancy, can result in a serious adverse effect.

Scientific studies into the effectiveness of balneotherapy do not show that balneotherapy is effective for treating rheumatoid arthritis. There is also no evidence indicating a more effective type of bath, or that bathing is more effective than exercise, relaxation therapy, or mudpacks. Most of the studies on balneotherapy have methodological flaws and are not reliable. A 2009 review of all published clinical evidence concluded that existing research is not sufficiently strong to draw firm conclusions about the efficacy of balneotherapy.

"Balneophototherapy" combines salt bathing (balneotherapy) and exposure to ultraviolet B-light (UVB) as a potential treatment for severe, chronic plaque psoriasis. A Cochrane review found low-quality evidence that salt bathing combined with UVB may relieve psoriasis severity compared to UVB treatment only.

A 2018 systematic review concluded that "balneotherapy and spa therapy may be considered useful interventions for managing stress conditions".

== Crenotherapy ==
The crenotherapy (from the Greek krene, "source") is closely related to the balneotherapy:

1. Some sources equate it with balneotherapy, with the term "crenotherapy" most used in France and "balneotherapy" in Germany;
2. Some researchers divide hydrotherapy into branches, with balneotherapy applying mineral water externally, and crenotherapy taking it internally.

Generally, crenotherapy is associated with the use of natural mineral waters as a medicine, including the trace levels of substances. Drinking of mineral water is sometimes called hydropinotherapy (from the Greek hydro, "water" and pino, "drink").

== See also ==
- Balneological peat
- Enoch Heinrich Kisch
- Destination spa
- Hot spring
- Mineral spa
- Onsen
- Peloid
- Thalassotherapy

== Sources ==
- Chisholm, Hugh, ed. (1911). "Balneotherapeutics" . Encyclopædia Britannica. Vol. 3 (11th ed.). Cambridge University Press. pp. 284–285.
- Crotti, C.; Solimene, U. (2018). "Thermal Rehabilitation of Geriatric Patients". Rehabilitation Medicine for Elderly Patients. Cham: Springer International Publishing. doi:10.1007/978-3-319-57406-6_15. ISBN 978-3-319-57405-9.
- Teixeira, Frederico J.; Gomes, Celso S. F. (2021). "Natural Mineral Water Used in Health Resort Medicine". Minerals latu sensu and Human Health. Cham: Springer International Publishing. doi:10.1007/978-3-030-65706-2_14. ISBN 978-3-030-65705-5.
