= National Psoriasis Foundation =

Nonprofit organization

- Abbreviation: NPF
- Founded: March 14, 1967; 59 years ago
- Tax ID no.: 93-0571472
- Legal status: 501(c)(3) non-profit organization
- Headquarters: Portland, Oregon
- Chair: Colby Evans
- President and CEO: Randy Beranek
- Revenue: $9,859,476 (2015)
- Expenses: $9,559,235 (2015)
- Endowment: $5,562,686
- Employees: 70 (2014)
- Volunteers: 6,705 (2014)
- Website: www.psoriasis.org
- Formerly called: Psoriasis Society of Oregon, National Psoriasis Society

The National Psoriasis Foundation (NPF) is one of the world's largest nonprofit organization serving people with psoriasis and psoriatic arthritis. The NPF provides information and services to help people manage their condition while supporting research to find a cure. In addition to serving more than 3 million people annually through patient and professional health education and advocacy initiatives, the NPF has funded more than $10 million in psoriatic disease research grants and fellowships.

== About the organization ==
The National Psoriasis Foundation (NPF) focuses on improving the health of people with psoriasis and psoriatic arthritis. Through the organization's work to increase research, improve access to care, and expand knowledge of the psoriatic disease, the NPF aims to:

- Reduce or eliminate disease symptoms because patients are on the right treatments
- Lower an individual's risk of developing illnesses related to the psoriatic disease by promoting good disease management and healthy behaviors
- Ease the negative impact the psoriatic disease has on the personal life, career, and finances of those affected by making the psoriatic disease more widely understood

== Research ==
The NPF works to increase the number of dollars, scientists, and quality research projects devoted to psoriatic disease to find better treatments and a cure.

Each year, the NPF awards Discovery Grants and Translational Grants to support the start-up of new and innovative studies.

NPF Discovery Grants are one-year awards of up to $75,000 that fund researchers to explore preliminary ideas and conduct proof-of-concept experiments. The goal is to stimulate the development of new research programs in the field of psoriatic disease that are capable of competing for long-term funding from the National Institutes of Health or other agencies in the future. Funded research areas include, but are not limited to, genetics, cell biology, immunology, and epidemiology/health services.

NPF Translational Grants' are two-year awards up to $200,000 total that is focused on moving scientific discoveries generated during laboratory or clinical research into projects that clearly benefit patients. In 2015, the National Psoriasis Foundation and the Arthritis National Research Foundation collaborated on a special Psoriatic Arthritis Research Grant.

To address the shortage of clinicians with in-depth knowledge of the psoriatic disease, the National Psoriasis Foundation awards annual Medical Dermatology Fellowships. The fellowships, one-year awards up to $50,000, aim to increase the number of scientists focused on studying and treating psoriatic disease by encouraging young scientists to become physician researchers and dedicate their careers to psoriatic disease.

The National Psoriasis Victor Henschel BioBank is a collection of biological samples and clinical information used by qualified scientists to advance the field of psoriasis genetics. It is one of the largest collections of psoriasis DNA samples in the United States.

As the catalyst for psoriatic disease research, NPF is dedicated to promoting patient involvement in research studies and clinical trials. NPF offers research and clinical trial referral services that provide targeted outreach to people with psoriasis and psoriatic arthritis.

== Advocacy ==
The National Psoriasis Foundation focuses on changing policy to increase the federal government's attention on psoriatic disease, and to ensure that people get access to the treatments and medical specialists they need to best manage their condition.

Through the collective efforts of tens of thousands of advocates nationwide, NPF works to:

- Make insurance fair and affordable and improve coverage for people with psoriatic disease
- Set public health policy for psoriasis and psoriatic arthritis through the findings from data collection at the Centers for Disease Control and Prevention (CDC)
- Improve the safety and affordability of psoriasis and psoriatic arthritis treatments
- Increase federal funding for psoriasis and psoriatic arthritis research in order to find better treatments and a cure.

== Education ==
The National Psoriasis Foundation provides people with psoriasis and psoriatic arthritis and their healthcare providers the latest information, education, and critical support services so they can best manage their condition and improve overall health and well-being.

Free health webcasts from leading psoriatic disease experts arm people with information to reduce pain, inflammation, and itching; clear skin; loosen joints; better understand future treatment options; and decrease their risk for related conditions associated with psoriatic diseases like heart disease and diabetes.

More than Skin Deep is a series of live patient-focused events held nationwide. This educational program provides people with the latest information from leading experts to best manage their condition.

The NPF offers people who are newly diagnosed support from trained peer mentors with its Psoriasis One-to-One mentor program. Additionally, the organization has a health educator on staff who is available to answer questions about psoriasis, psoriatic arthritis, treatment options, and related topics.

The NPF also offers professional education for healthcare providers with CME events and other programs.

== Organization and people ==
Founded and headquartered in Portland, Oregon, the Psoriasis Foundation opened its second office in Alexandria, Virginia, in 2013. As of 2015, the organization has 10 Community Divisions in Chicago, Dallas/Fort Worth, Florida South, Florida West, Los Angeles, New York City, Northern California, Portland, San Diego, and Washington, D.C. These community divisions, led by a National Psoriasis Foundation community development manager and a group of volunteers, focus on fundraising, patient and health care provider outreach, grassroots advocacy and local education.

Team NPF is a group of everyday people with or without psoriatic disease who are walking, running, cycling, and DIY-ing for psoriasis and psoriatic arthritis cure. Team NPF Walks are held in communities around the country. In August 2015, the National Psoriasis Foundation hosted its inaugural Team NPF Cycle event.

== Funding ==
The National Psoriasis Foundation is a 501(c)(3) nonprofit organization.

In 2012, the organization received Charity Navigator's four-star rating, its highest rating, for its sound fiscal management and commitment to accountability and transparency. The NPF receives funding and support from individuals affected by psoriatic disease and their families, friends, and medical providers. Corporations and foundations also fund the education, advocacy, and research programs that help people with psoriatic disease better manage their condition and improve their overall health.
