= Enoch Beery Seitz =

American mathematician

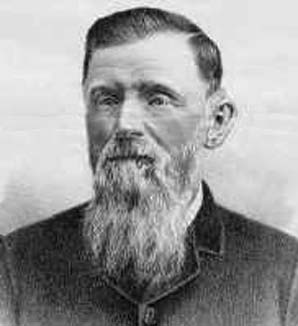
Enoch Beery Seitz

Enoch Beery Seitz (1846 - 1883) was an American mathematician who was Chair of Mathematics at North Missouri State Normal School (now know as Truman State University).

Enoch Berry Seitz was born 24 August 1846 in Fairfield County, Ohio.

Seitz was elected to the London Mathematical Society on 11 March 1880, only the fifth American to be so honored. Over 500 of his solutions were published in the Analyst, the Mathematical Visitor, the Mathematical Magazine, the School Visitor and the Educational Times of London, England.

He died 8 October 1883 at Adair, Missouri
