= Tubokosemie Abere =

Anglican bishop in Nigeria

Tubokosemie Aberei (born 18 August 1950) is a retired Anglican bishop in Nigeria: he was the Bishop of Okrika, one of nine in the Anglican Province of Niger Delta, itself one of fourteen within the Church of Nigeria.

He was consecrated as the pioneer Bishop of Okrika at St. Cyprian's Church, Port Harcourt on 16 November 2003 and enthroned in 2004. He retired in 2020.

== Education ==
Abere attended the Okrika Grammar School(OGS) from 1969 to 1973 and is a graduate of the University of Port Harcourt where he was the President of the National Union of Rivers State Students (NURSS), University of Port Harcourt (1980 - 1981). Rev Abere also attended Trinity College, Umuahia and obtained a Certificate in Theology in 1991.
