= Enoch Heinrich Kisch =

Austrian balneologist and gynecologist

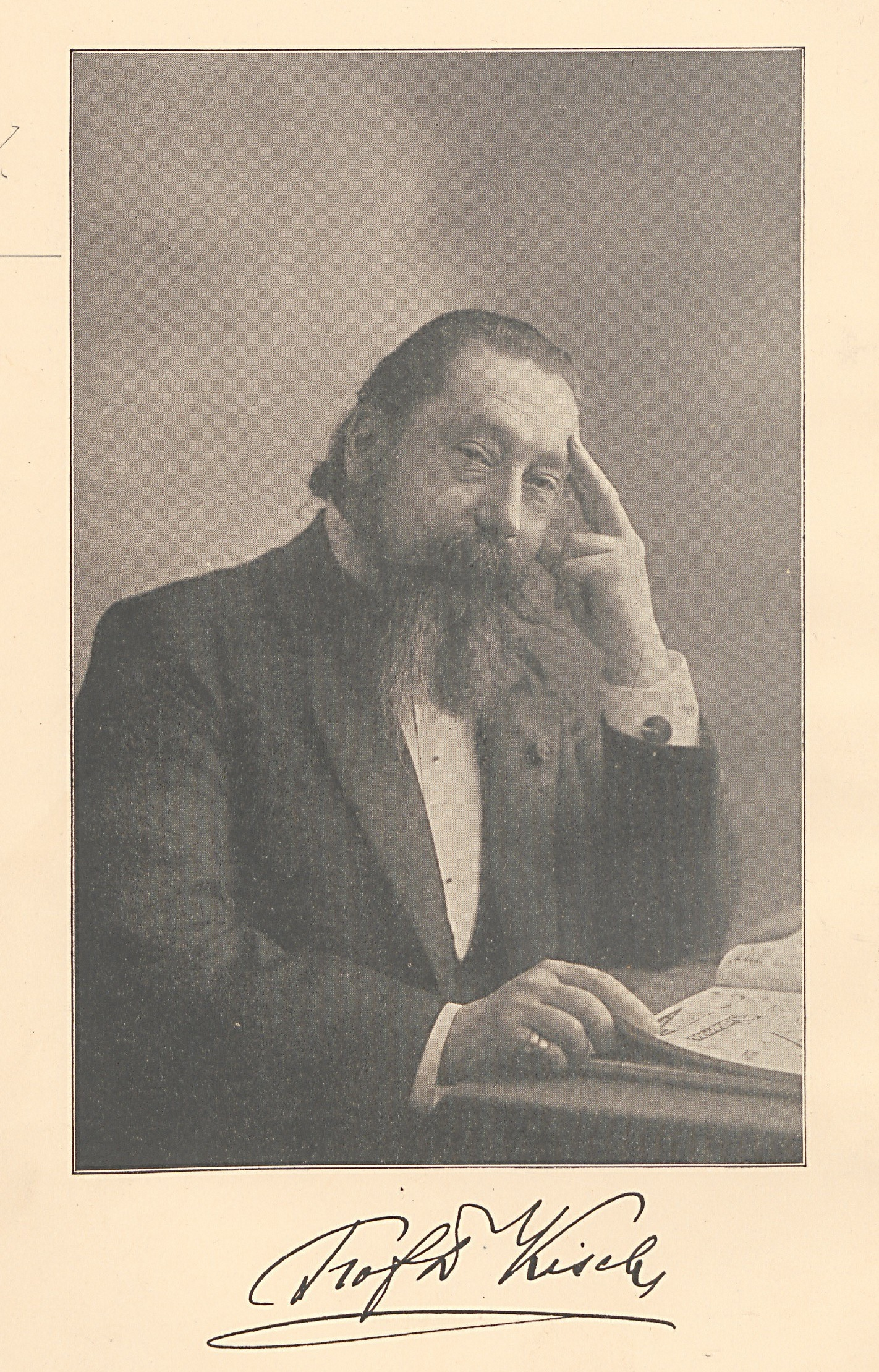
- Kisch, c. 1910
- Born: 6 May 1841; Prague, Bohemia, Austrian Empire
- Died: 24 August 1918 (aged 77); Marienbad, Bohemia, Austria-Hungary
- Occupations: Balneologist; gynaecologist

Enoch Heinrich Kisch (German: [ˈʔeːnɔχ ˈhaɪnʁiç ˈkɪʃ]; 6 May 1841 – 24 August 1918) was an Austrian balneologist, gynaecologist and writer born in Prague. He was the brother of Alexander Kisch (1848–1917), a noted rabbi and author.

Kisch was born in Prague in 1841. He graduated as a medical doctor in 1862 and in 1863 began work as a balneologist in Marienbad, where he contributed to the town becoming a health resort. He became privatdocent in balneotherapeutics at Prague University in 1867, and was appointed assistant professor in 1884.

From 1868, Kisch was an editor of the Allgemeine Balneologische Zeitung, and later became an editor of Jahrbucher fur Balneologie. He published various other works on the subjects of balneology and gyanecology. In 1914, he published an autobiographical work titled Erlebtes und Erstrebtes: Erinnerangen. He died in Marienbad on 24 August 1918.

== Selected publications ==
- Uber den Einfluss der Fettleibigkeit auf die weiblichen Sexualorgane, 1873
- Das klimakterische Altern der Frau, 1874
- Handbuch der allgemeinen und speciellen Balneotherapie, 1875
- Sterilitat des Weibes, 1895
- Grundriss der klinischen Balneotherapie, 1897
- Geschlechtsleben des Weibes in physiologischer, pathologischer und hygienischer Beziehung, 1904
