= George Pope Morris =

American editor, poet, and songwriter

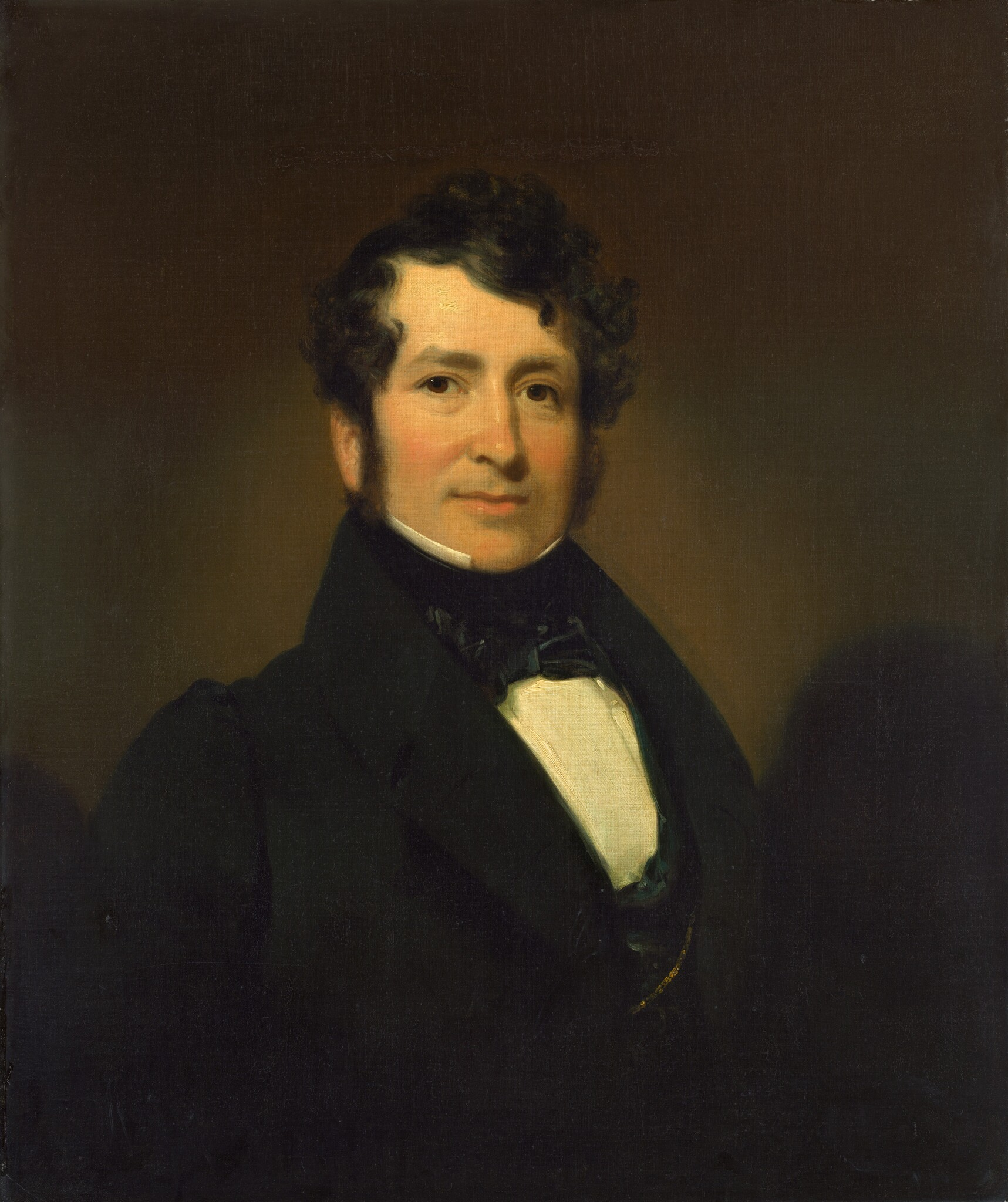
- Portrait by Henry Inman, 1836
- Born: October 10, 1802; Philadelphia, Pennsylvania
- Died: July 6, 1864 (aged 61); New York City
- Resting place: Davenport Cemetery Davenport, Delaware County, New York, USA
- Occupations: Editor; literary critic; poet; songwriter
- Spouse: Mary Worthington Hopkins.
- Children: William H. Morris
- Writing career
- Notable works: Woodman, Spare That Tree.

George Pope Morris (October 10, 1802 – July 6, 1864) was an American editor, poet, and songwriter.

== Life and work ==
George Pope Morris was born in Philadelphia on October 10, 1802. He founded the New-York Mirror, and Ladies' Literary Gazette, Being a Repository of Miscellaneous Productions in Prose and Verse with its first issue dated August 2, 1823. Morris, who was then 22 years old, served as publisher while Samuel Woodworth served as its editor. Woodworth left the publication after about a year and Morris assumed the title of editor, though he was more of a managing editor and distributed editorial duties to others. It became a fashionable journal but also influenced the rise of the Knickerbocker Group of writers in New York. During this time, though he was not actually an officer, he earned the nickname of "Colonel" and, later, "General" Morris.

With Nathaniel Parker Willis, he co-founded the daily New York Evening Mirror by merging his fledgling weekly New-York Mirror with Willis's American Monthly in August 1831. Morris is credited with the longevity the Evening Mirror would enjoy and for giving it a wide scope, covering not only news and entertainment but reviews of the fine arts, editorials, and many original engravings. Morris also funded in advance Willis's trip to Europe, for which Willis wrote several letters to be published in the Mirror, which helped establish his fame. On January 29, 1845, the Evening Mirror published an "advance copy" of Edgar Allan Poe's "The Raven". It was the first publication of that poem with the author's name. The publishing partners also issued an anthology called The Prose and Poetry of America in 1845.

Willis and Morris left the Mirror in 1846 and founded a new weekly, the National Press, which was renamed the Home Journal after eight months. Beginning in 1854 his son William, who had graduated from the United States Military Academy in 1851, resigned from the Army and worked for the newspaper as an editor. Beginning in 1901, it was published as Town and Country and is still in print under that title today. Their prospectus for the publication, published November 21, 1846, announced their intentions to create a magazine "to circle around the family table".

In addition to his publishing and editorial work, Morris was popular as a poet and songwriter; especially well-known was his poem-turned-song "Woodman, Spare that Tree!" "Woodman, Spare that Tree!" was first published in the January 17, 1837, issue of the Mirror under the title "The Oak" and was that year set to music by Henry Russell before being reprinted under its more common title in 1853. Lines from the poem are often quoted by environmentalists. The poem was also included in one of Morris's volumes of collected poems, The Deserted Bride and Other Poems, 1838, which ran into several editions.

Morris was friends with artist Robert Walter Weir to whom he dedicated his only book of prose, The Little Frenchman and His Water Lots (1839). A collection of short stories and sketches, the little Frenchman of the title story was the victim of an unscrupulous dealer in real estate bordering Wallabout Bay, that was under water at high tide.

Morris died July 6, 1864. Horace Binney Wallace wrote the introductory biographical notice for Morris's posthumous collected works.

== Critical response ==
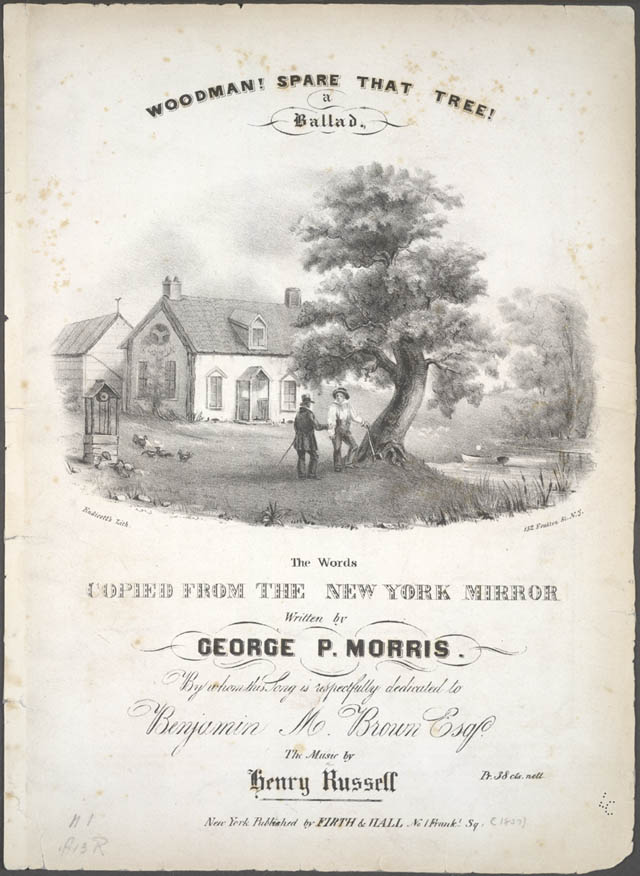
Sheet music cover of Woodman, Spare that Tree!

Morris was particularly known for his songwriting. His songs were popular enough that Graham's Magazine in Philadelphia promised Morris $50, sight unseen, for any work he wanted to publish in the periodical. The United States Review in 1855 claimed Morris's songs "are known among every inglenook and fireside corner of America. Most undoubtedly does he possess the widest and most thorough popularity of any writer for melody now living".

Critic and writer Edgar Allan Poe acknowledged the popularity of Morris's songs, "which have taken fast hold upon the popular taste, and which are deservedly celebrated". In April 1840, Poe wrote that Morris was "very decidedly, our best writer of songs—and, in saying this, I mean to assign him a high rank as poet". Willis wrote of Morris: "He is just what poets would be if they sang like birds without criticism... nothing can stop a song of his".

Morris was one of several poets who were gently mocked by Bayard Taylor in his 1876 verse parody The Echo Club and Other Literary Diversions.

== Bibliography ==
- The Deserted Bride and Other Poems (1838)
- The Little Frenchman and His Water Lots (1839)
