= Enoch Jeavons =

English cricketer

Cricket information
- Batting: Right-handed

Career statistics
Competition	First-class
Matches	1
Runs scored	1
Batting average	1.00
100s/50s	0/0
Top score	1*
Catches/stumpings	2/–
- Source: Cricinfo, 8 November 2022

Enoch Percy Jeavons (12 January 1893 – 29 July 1967) was an English first-class cricketer who played a single game for Worcestershire against Gloucestershire in June 1924.

He made little impression on what was a disastrous game for his county, scoring 0 in the first innings as Worcestershire lost their first five wickets for just four runs before recovering to make 115, then making 1 not out in the second as they were bowled out for 48 to hand Gloucestershire a 102-run victory. He did however hold two catches.

Jeavons was born in Dudley, which was then in Worcestershire; he died in the Kates Hill region of the same town at the age of 74.
