= Samuel Woodworth =

American poet (1784–1842)

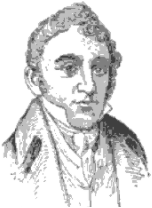
- Born: January 13, 1784; Scituate, Massachusetts
- Died: December 9, 1842 (aged 58); New York, New York
- Occupation: Writer
- Spouse: Lydia Reeder (m. 1810)
- Children: 10

Samuel Woodworth (January 13, 1784 – December 9, 1842) was an American writer, literary journalist, playwright, librettist, and poet. He is best remembered for the poem "The Old Oaken Bucket" (1817), but he is also the first American to write a historical novel.

== Life ==
Woodworth was born in Scituate, Massachusetts, to Revolutionary War veteran Benjamin Woodworth and his wife Abigail Bryant. He was apprenticed to Benjamin Russell, editor of the Columbian Sentinel. He then moved to New Haven, Connecticut, where he briefly published the Belles-Lettres Repository, a weekly. He next moved to New York City, but recalled New Haven in his A Poem: New Haven.

Woodworth married Lydia Reeder in New York City on September 23, 1810. They had ten children between 1811 and 1829. Woodworth remained in New York for the rest of his life, dying there on December 9, 1842.

Woodworth's son, Selim E. Woodworth, was a U.S. Navy officer who took part in the rescue of the snowbound Donner Party in California. The USS Woodworth (DD-460) was named for him.

== "The Old Oaken Bucket" ==
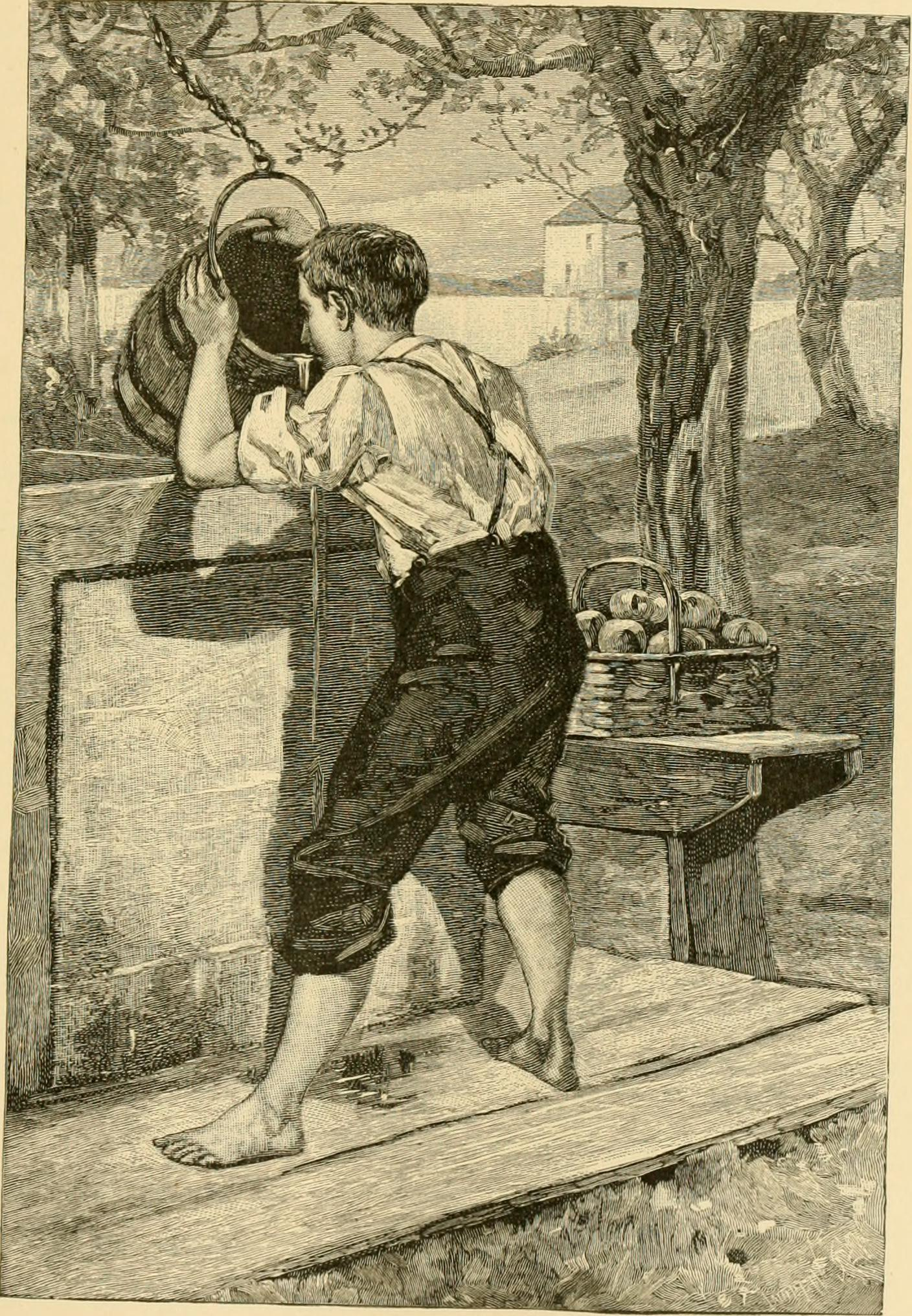
Illustration for "The Old Oaken Bucket", 1882

Woodworth is best known for the poem "The Old Oaken Bucket" (1817). The first stanza reads:

How dear to this heart are the scenes of my childhood,
When fond recollection presents them to view!
The orchard, the meadow, the deep-tangled wild-wood,
And every loved spot which my infancy knew!
The wide-spreading pond, and the mill that stood by it,
The bridge, and the rock where the cataract fell,
The cot of my father, the dairy-house nigh it,
And e'en the rude bucket that hung in the well-
The old oaken bucket, the iron-bound bucket,
The moss-covered bucket which hung in the well.

In 1826 the poem was paired with music by George Kiallmark (a song originally written as a setting of a poem excerpted from Thomas Moore's Lalla Rookh). By the early 20th century it became one of America's most popular songs, and the tune was further adopted for use with other texts. It was recorded in 1899 by The Haydn Quartet, a famous barbershop quartet, and was released on Berliner Gramophone.

=== Old Oaken Bucket House ===
The Old Oaken Bucket House in Scituate, Massachusetts, is on the National Register of Historic Places. A Massachusetts historical marker, erected c. 1930 by the Massachusetts Bay Colony Tercentenary Commission, is located near the house—it reads:

THE OLD OAKEN BUCKET
Homestead and well made
famous by Samuel Woodworth in
his poem "The Old Oaken Bucket."
Homestead erected by John
Northey in 1675: Poet born in
Scituate January 13, 1785.

=== The Old Oaken Bucket trophy ===
The Old Oaken Bucket trophy has been awarded every year since 1925 to the winner of the Big Ten Conference college football game between Purdue University and Indiana University. Although Woodworth was not from Indiana, the trophy's name refers to the sentiment that Hoosiers have for their home state.

== Works by Samuel Woodworth ==
=== Published poetry ===
- "The Hunters of Kentucky"
- The Heroes of the lake : a poem, in two books
- Ode written for the celebration of the French Revolution, in the city of New York
- An excursion of the dog-cart : a poem
- Bubble & squeak, or, A dish of all sorts : being a collection of American poems
- New-Haven : a poem, satirical and sentimental, with critical, humorous, descriptive, historical, biographical, and explanatory notes
- The poetical works of Samuel Woodworth
- Quarter-day, or, The horrors of the first of May : a poem
- Erie and Champlain, or, Champlain and Plattsburg : an ode
- "American Music: Remembering Samuel Woodworth" - excerpts of his verse and songs

=== Plays ===
- La Fayette, or, The Castle of Olmutz
- King's Bridge Cottage : a revolutionary tale founded on an incident which occurred a few days previous to the evacuation of N. York by the British : a drama in two acts
- The widow's son, or, Which is the traitor : a melo-drama in three acts
- Bunker-Hill, or, The death of General Warren : an historic tragedy, in five acts
- The Foundling of the Sea

=== Opera librettos ===
- The deed of gift : a comic opera in three acts
- The forest rose, or, American farmers : a drama in two acts

=== Novel ===
- The Champions of Freedom, or The Mysterious Chief, A Romance of the Nineteenth Century, Founded on the Events of the War, Between the United States and Great Britain, which Terminated in March, 1815 (1816), the first historical novel by an American author

=== Hymn ===
- Samuel was a founding member of the New York Society of the New Church (Swedenborgian) and one of his poems became a hymn - "Oh for a seraph's golden lyre" - which is still sung by some New Church congregations.
