= Emeric Essex Vidal =

English painter

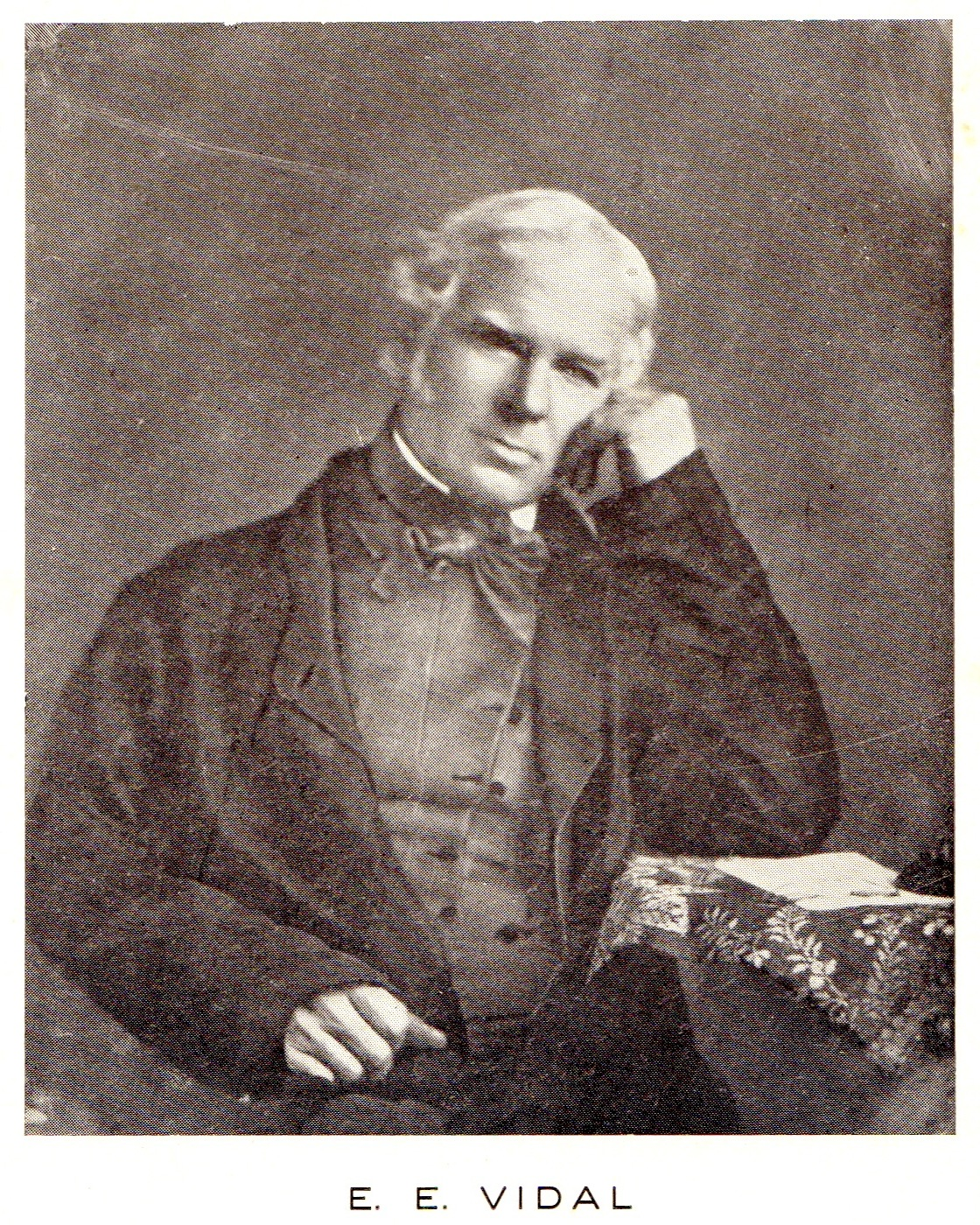
Vidal later in life (daguerreotype)

Emeric Essex Vidal (29 March 1791 – 7 May 1861) was an English watercolourist and naval officer. His opportunities for travel, his curiosity about local customs and human types, and his eye for the picturesque, led him to make paintings which are now historical resources. A landscape painter and a costumbrista, he was the first visual artist to leave records of the ordinary inhabitants of the newly emergent Argentina and Uruguay, including the first depictions of gauchos. He also left records of Canada, Brazil, the West Indies and St Helena, where he sketched the newly deceased Napoleon.

No full-length biography of Vidal yet exists; only brief accounts written from the viewpoints of the lands he visited. Although a number of his watercolours have been published as hand-coloured aquatints, or by modern printing methods, or sold at auction, it is plausible that most have been lost or await rediscovery in private collections.

== Biography ==
=== Life ===
==== Family background ====
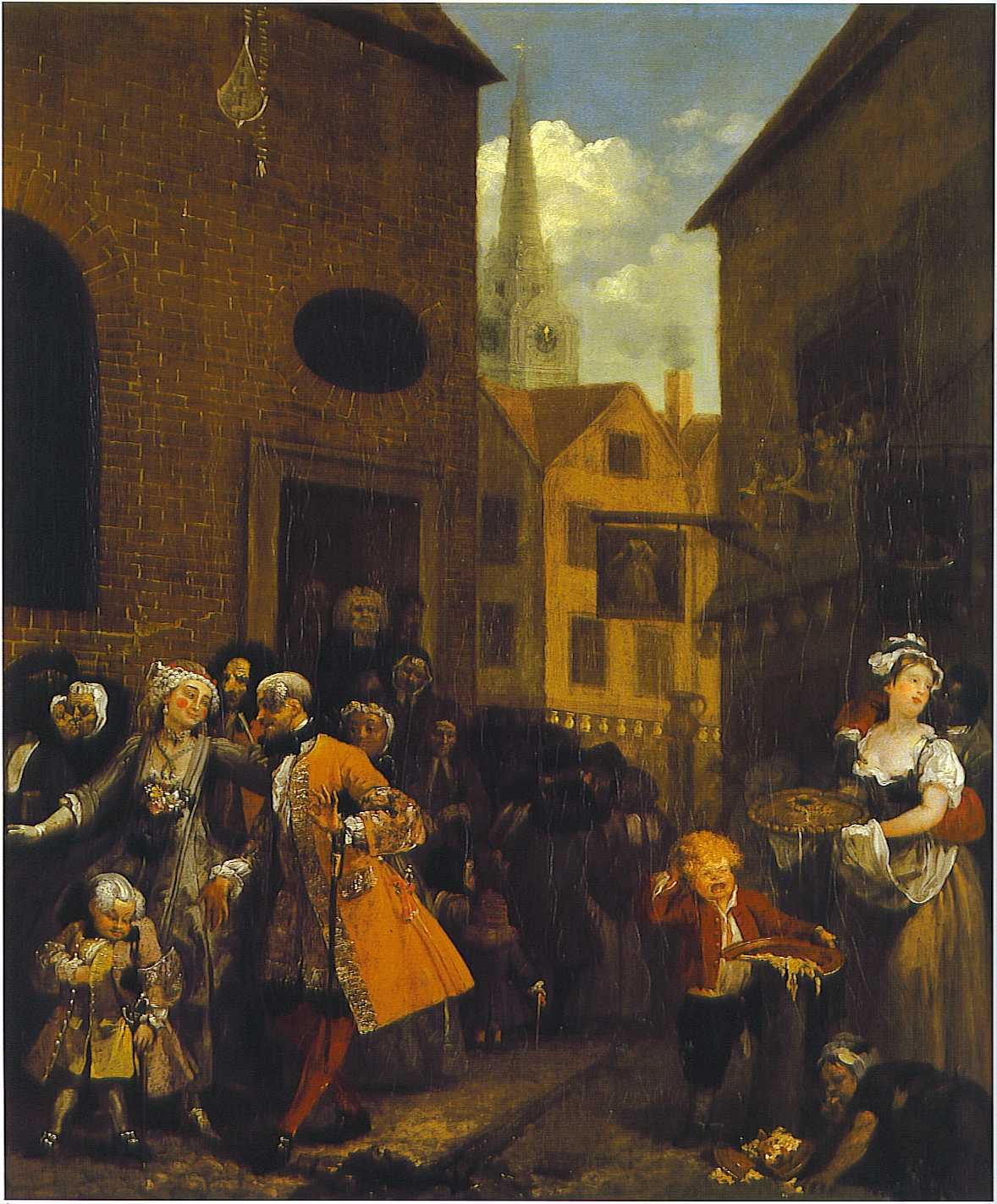
La Patente, Soho. Fashionably dressed Huguenot churchgoers are contrasted with their depraved English neighbours. (William Hogarth, 1736)

Vidal was born on 29 March 1791 at Brentford, Middlesex, the second son of Emeric Vidal and Jane Essex. His family background was, by the standards of the day, highly unconventional.

His father, Emeric senior, was baptised in La Patente, a French-speaking Huguenot church in Soho, London. (The Vidal family had emigrated to England from France to escape persecution following the revocation of the Edict of Nantes (1685). The Vidals thought they had come from the Basque country originally.) (Note: They could recall being devout Catholics in Spain. They claimed to be descended from a St Vidal or St Aymerick who, according to legend, journeyed with St Paul; they owned a document in Old Spanish that described the saint and his miracles (Nesbitt & Gardner 1914, p. 38))

Vidal's etc. Naturalization Act 1772
- Act of Parliament
- Parliament of Great Britain
- Long title: An Act for naturalizing Emeric Vidal, Philippe Rivier, and Abraham Favenc.
- Citation: 13 Geo. 3. c. 2 Pr.
- Territorial extent: Great Britain

Dates
- Royal assent: 21 December 1772
- Commencement: 26 November 1772 (Note: Start of session.)

Status: Current legislation

The Huguenot community, who were Calvinists, were officially tolerated in England; nevertheless, they were a religious and linguistic minority, successful and self-confident, sometimes attracting popular hostility. They had a sense of 'otherness' and usually did not intermarry with the host population. Though born in England, in law Emeric senior was a foreigner who could not acquire British citizenship except by obtaining a private act of Parliament, which he did by the Vidal's etc. Naturalization Act 1772 (13 Geo. 3. c. 2 Pr.).

During the wars against France he was a naval agent (a civilian position similar to a banker). He was a secretary to admirals Sir Robert Kingsmill, John Lockhart-Ross and Robert Duff.

Emeric senior married out of the Huguenot community by wedding Jane Essex in an Anglican ceremony at St Bride's Church, Fleet Street, London, in 1801 by which time the couple already had a teenage daughter and three sons. Jane Essex's antecedents are not known. A Jane Essex was baptised at the Foundling Hospital in 1760; baby girls abandoned there were usually brought up to be domestic servants. Whatever his mother's origins, until he was ten years old Vidal and his siblings were literally bastards, a very stigmatised status at the time.

The Vidal brothers were physically small but all three pursued naval careers in the Napoleonic Wars and afterwards. The eldest was Richard Emeric Vidal (1785–1854), who was in battles and skirmishes in which 121 vessels were captured or destroyed; the youngest was Alexander Thomas Emeric Vidal (1792–1863), a hydrographer who charted many unknown waters and became a Vice-Admiral. After their retirement from the Navy the oldest and youngest brothers bought land and became pioneers (Note: Emeric Essex had not the opportunity to do so, however, because in 1832 he was seriously wounded.) in Upper Canada.

==== Marriages, family and death ====
In 1814 Emeric Essex Vidal courted Anna Jane Capper. Her father, a pluralist clergyman (Note: The Rev James Capper was — simultaneously — the Vicar of Wilmington, Sussex, the Rector of Ashurst, Kent and the Vicar of Lullington, Sussex, having been preferred to these cures by aristocratic patrons (Kentish Gazette, 16 June 1779; Sussex Advertiser, 4 January 1802; Hampshire Telegraph, 7 March 1803).) with a private income, (Note: On his death he left 60 cases of "curious old wines" and a collection of 1,200 choice greenhouse plants: Sussex Advertiser 1835, p. 1.) opposed the match, probably because of Vidal's social origins; but the couple eloped and were married — at St Bride's, Fleet Street, like the Vidal parents 13 years before them. They had six children, one of whom, Owen Emeric Vidal, was the first Anglican bishop in West Africa and, like his father, a gifted linguist. He knew Tamil, Malay and Yoruba.

In 1832 Vidal was badly wounded and, although he volunteered for another tour of duty and struggled on for five years in frequent pain, he was obliged to retire from active service on half pay which, owing to an anomaly in the naval regulations, was only 4 shillings a day. Despite that, he inherited a 15-room house standing in 18 acres of meadow. After his first wife's death in 1846 Vidal married Anne Humfry. They did not live in penury. (Note: The 1851 census records they had a cook and two servants. The address is the same 15-room Hersham Lodge standing in its 18 acres.)

Emeric Essex Vidal died in Brighton on 7 May 1861.

=== Naval career ===
==== Travels, local knowledge and visual training ====
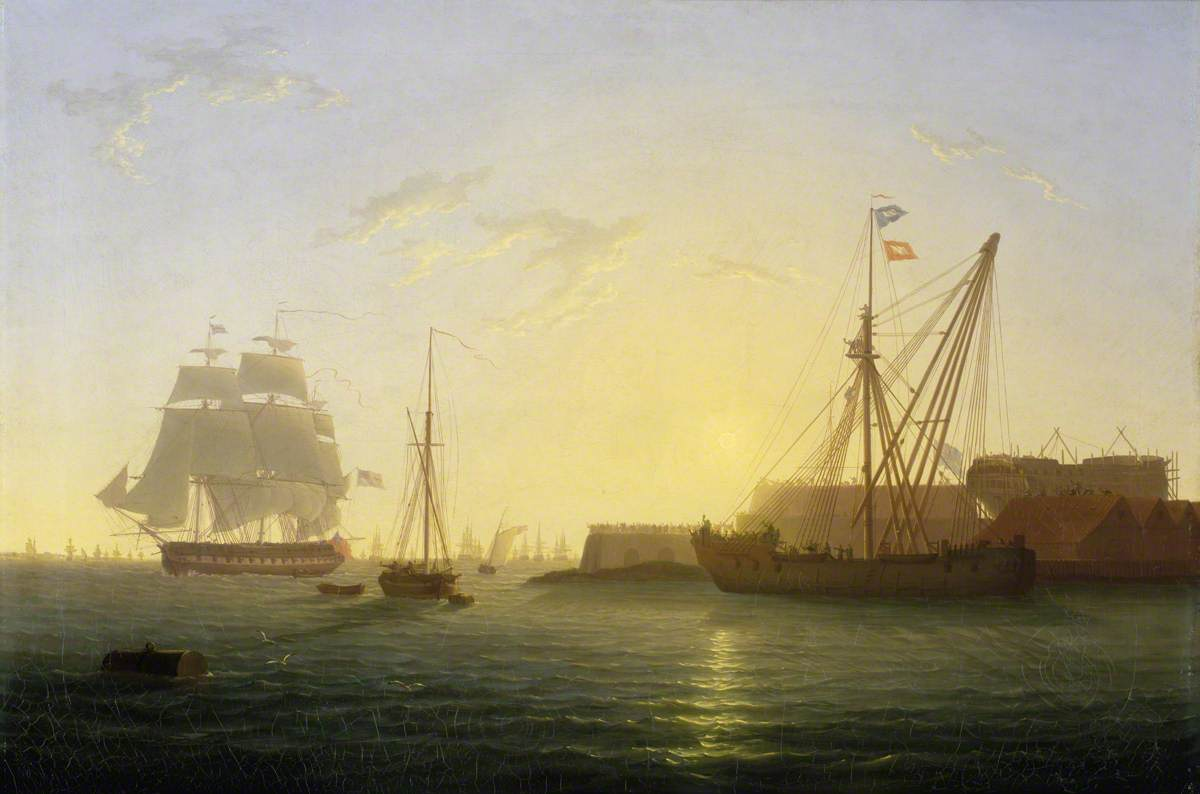
Clyde (left), Vidal's first ship

Vidal entered the Royal Navy at the age of 15 as a volunteer (i.e. an ordinary seaman) on board HMS Clyde, serving under Captain Edward Owen. In 1807 the Portuguese royal court sailed for Rio de Janeiro, escorted by the British Royal Navy, to escape from Napoleon's troops. Two South American art historians have claimed that Vidal was on that expedition, it being his first sight of Brazil. No water colours painted on that journey have been identified, if indeed he went on it.

In 1808 Vidal was promoted to the rank of purser. He performed that function on board several ships including HMSS Calypso, Calliope, Speedy, Bann, Hyacinth, Gloucester, Ganges, Asia, Spartiate and Dublin.

Essentially, the purser handled a ship's business affairs; so, when an admiral needed to appoint a secretary, he naturally chose a purser. Like his father before him, Vidal was Secretary to several flag officers. The post demanded abilities unusual in a seaman. The Naval and Military Gazette explained why:

Independent of the acknowledged ability required to fill an office of this description, particularly as Secretary to a Commander-in-Chief, who, in addition to the routine business of the fleet, has a vast deal of diplomatic correspondence to conduct, and who is frequently brought in contact with the most skilful and experienced statesmen, in the discussion of matters involving the question of peace or war, —independent of this, a Secretary must be extremely well informed, not only in relation to general history, but the complicated forms of international law, so as to steer clear of mistakes, and avoid involving his Admiral in errors which might be turned to the disadvantage of his country's interests. He is, in fact, the oracle to whom every intricate question is referred...

Vidal was Secretary to Sir Graham Moore ( Baltic, 1813); Sir Edward Owen (Canada, 1815); Sir Robert Lambert (Cape and St Helena, 1820-1); Sir Edward Owen (West Indies, 1823); Sir Robert Otway (South America, 1826–29); and Sir Graham Hamond (South America, 1834–36). In those stations, therefore, it was Vidal's job to become the "oracle" who could be consulted on local affairs and politics. Being a linguist, he had to interpret for admirals and senior officers on their shore visits.

Relevantly, a British naval officer was strongly encouraged to develop his abilities for observation and drawing. Officers routinely painted coastal features — in colour — and put them in logs and charts. "The common thread ... was the belief that ...'seeing is an art which must be learnt'."

==== Near-fatal wounding ====
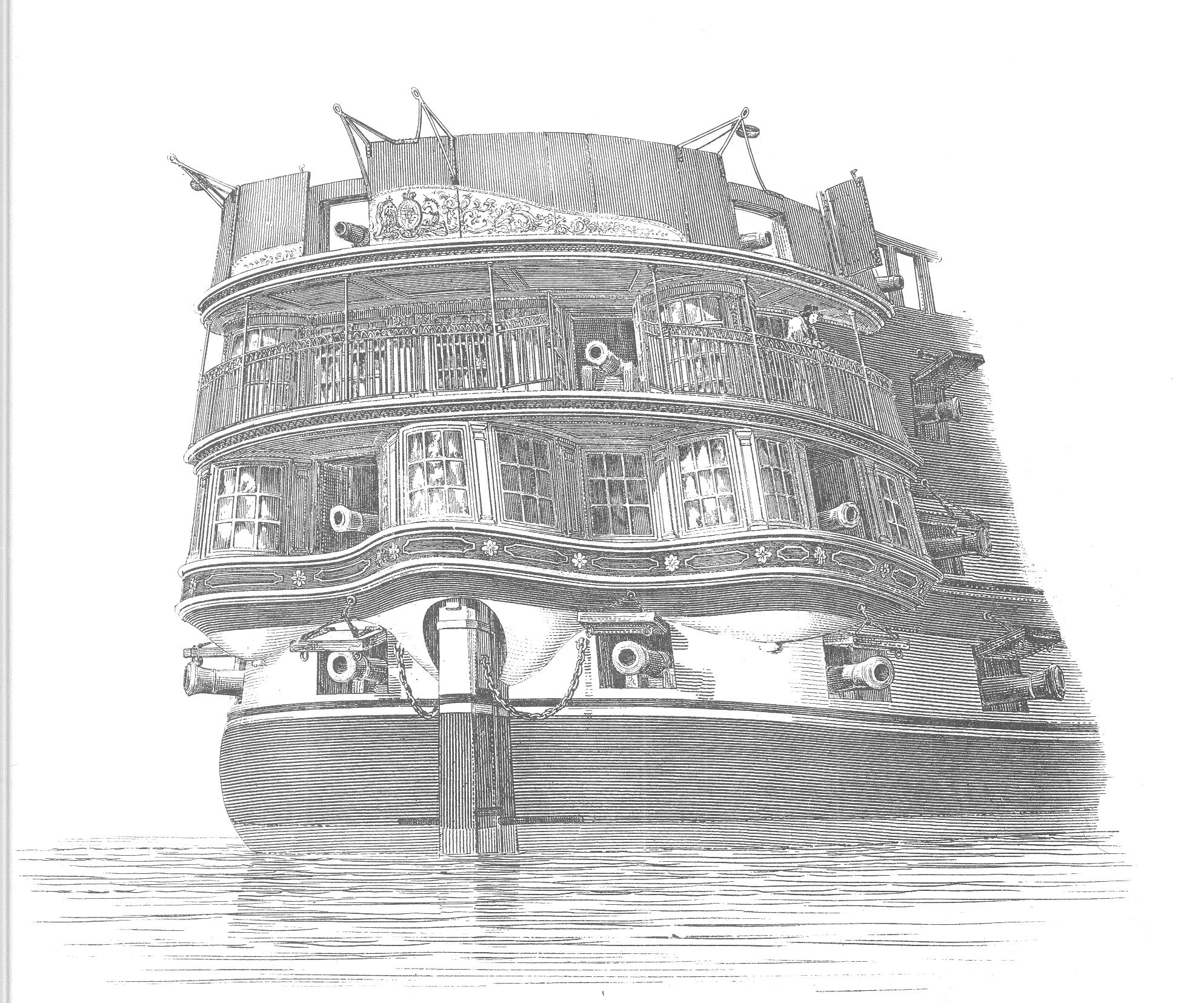
HMS Asia, stern view. While serving as her purser Vidal was seriously wounded.

In 1832 Vidal was seriously wounded in the Portuguese War of the Two Brothers. He was acting as interpreter to the admiral's flag captain and they went on shore in Porto to observe a Dom Pedro military position which, however, came under attack from a Dom Miguel force. He was pierced through the body (two sources say through the liver) by a musket ball. A British officer told the Sunday Times:

Mr Vidal, the admiral's purser [has] been shot through both sides above the hip. He is not yet dead, but his case is a bad one. He was a gentleman universally respected in the fleet, and his wound is deeply deplored.

Some newspapers reported he was dead. One source recalled that Vidal was brought back to a British ship bleeding, in great pain, in an open boat.

Vidal made a recovery and was "still serving, although almost worn out", as late as August 1836 aboard HMS Dublin at Rio de Janeiro, where he wrote a memorial to the Admiralty, complaining that admirals' secretaries got no pensions.

== Work ==
=== Artistic development ===
In this article a selection of Vidal's works is arranged in approximate chronological order so that his development may be perceived. It can be seen that he started as a landscape painter.

=== Canada ===
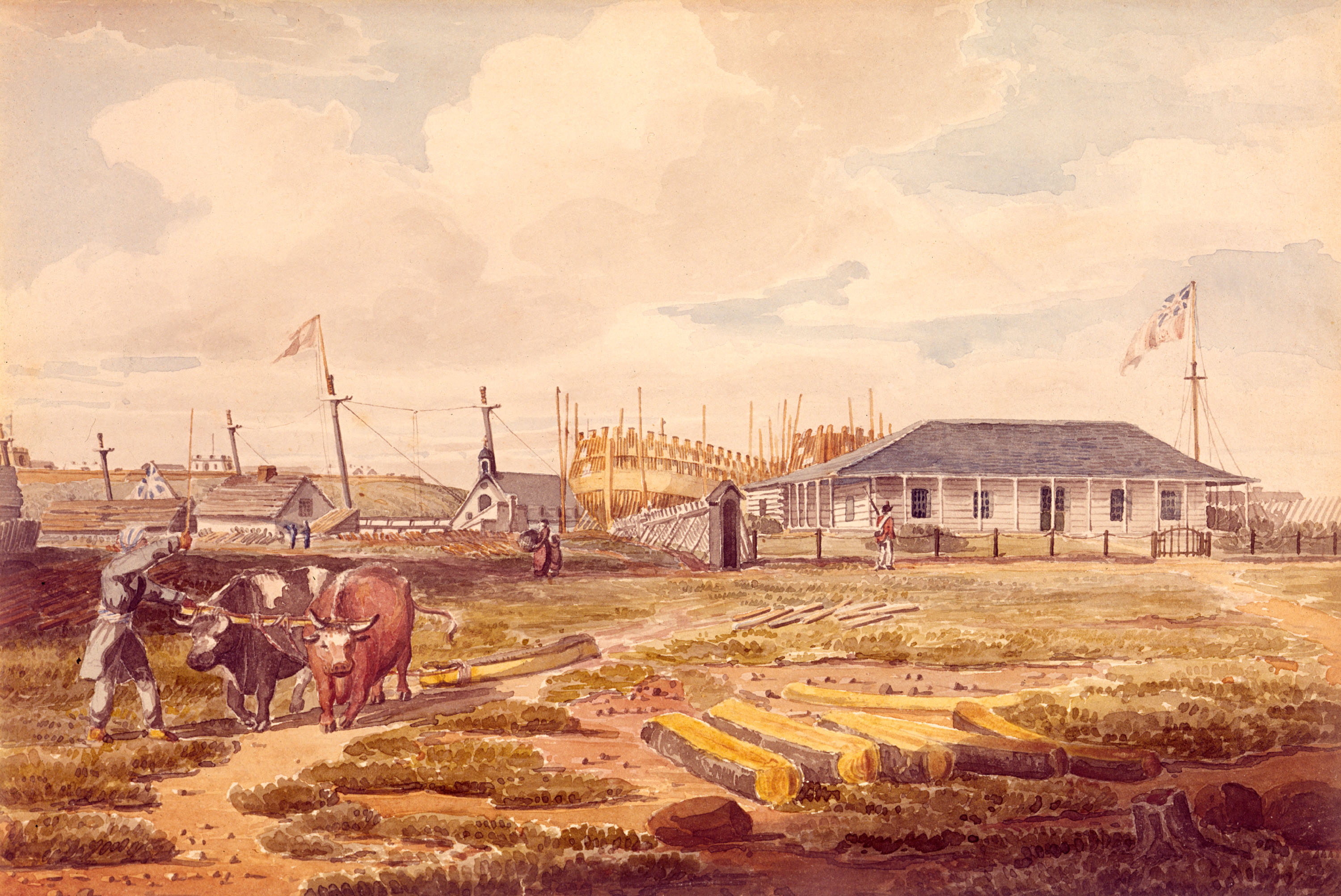
Commodore's House in the Naval Yard, Kingston, Upper Canada, July 1815 has been studied by military and architectural historians

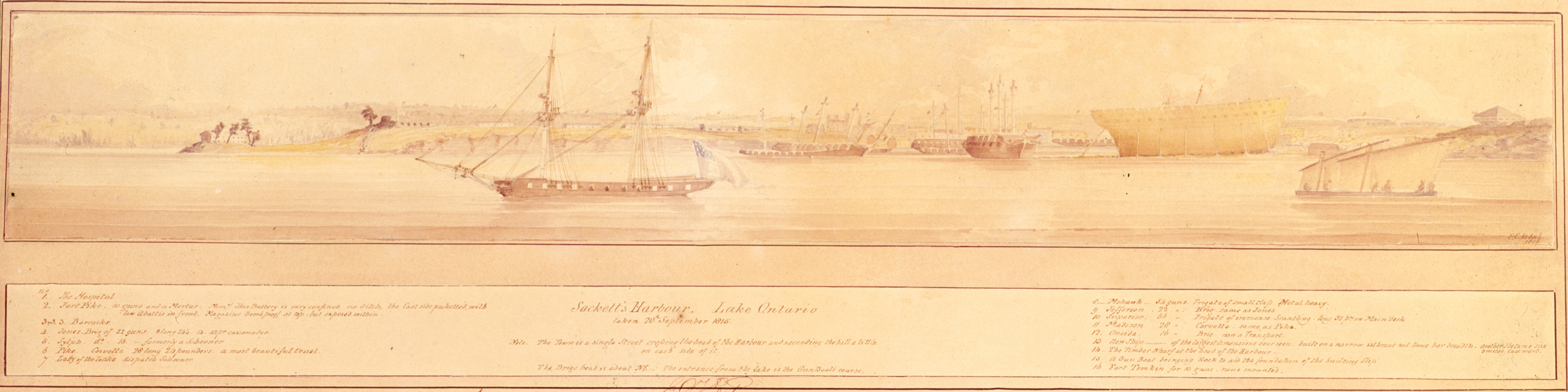
Sackets Harbor (zoom in)

In 1815, although on half pay, he visited the Canadian Great Lakes, where his younger brother Alexander Thomas Emeric was employed on surveying service, and acted for a time as Secretary to flag officer Commodore Owen. He made or copied a number of military maps and sketches. Whilst in the country he made various watercolour drawings, including Niagara Falls, which hangs in the National Gallery of Canada.

In the (then) recent naval war between the United States and Great Britain on Lake Ontario both sides had "constructed immense fleets in areas which were only sparsely settled", including large sea-going ships (the "Battle of the Carpenters"). They were built at the rival yards of Sackets Harbor and Kingston Royal Naval Dockyard.

Vidal's watercolour Sackett's Harbour, Lake Ontario taken 20th September 1815 is a panoramic view of the American facility, possibly sketched surreptitiously because of the still tense situation. It contains military intelligence now of considerable historical value.

His Commodore's House in the Naval Yard, Kingston, which is in the Royal Military College of Canada, (Note: As is the Sackets Harbor panorama.) documents the British/Canadian facility, with a ship actually under construction (see the oxen) — it could not be guaranteed that the peace treaty would hold. Its depiction of the Commodore's house has been studied by Canadian architectural historians for the light it throws on the origins of the Ontario Cottage type.

Vidal is sometimes listed as a Canadian artist. The Massey Library of the Royal Military College holds further images by Vidal. (Note: 1. An unknown painting of six indigenous people, five men, one woman, the men paddling some kind of dugout. Behind them, towards shore there are two similar boats that appear to be fishing. The shoreline is sparsely inhabited, with a low mountain in the distance. 2. A small water colour portrait in a 10.5x11.5 cm wooden frame with the notation "Admiral Vidal as a boy" in pencil on the back. (Source: Massey Library of the Royal Military College of Canada.))

=== First authenticated Brazilian visit ===
From May 1816 to end-September 1818 Vidal was purser of the 24-gun HMS Hyacynth, which was based in Rio de Janeiro. Wrote Luciana de Lima Martins:

Rights of access to Brazilian ports had been secured by Britain in the Anglo-Portuguese treaties of the seventeenth century. Furthermore, the Admiralty maintained ships-of-war at several foreign stations in order to protect British interests at sea. Rio, which had become the capital of the Portuguese empire when the French occupied Lisbon in 1808, was the headquarters of the Royal Navy's South American station.

British naval painters of the time were stunned by their first sight of Rio de Janeiro, its tropical light, its exotic flora and its scenery. Until 1930 collectors supposed all but three of Vidal's Brazilian paintings had been lost. It then emerged that his great-granddaughter had a collection of 25 including many Brazilian watercolours. On this visit Vidal painted landscapes — "they give us exact details of that fantastic vegetation, and architectural representations of great value, [but] the human figure appears as merely accessory".

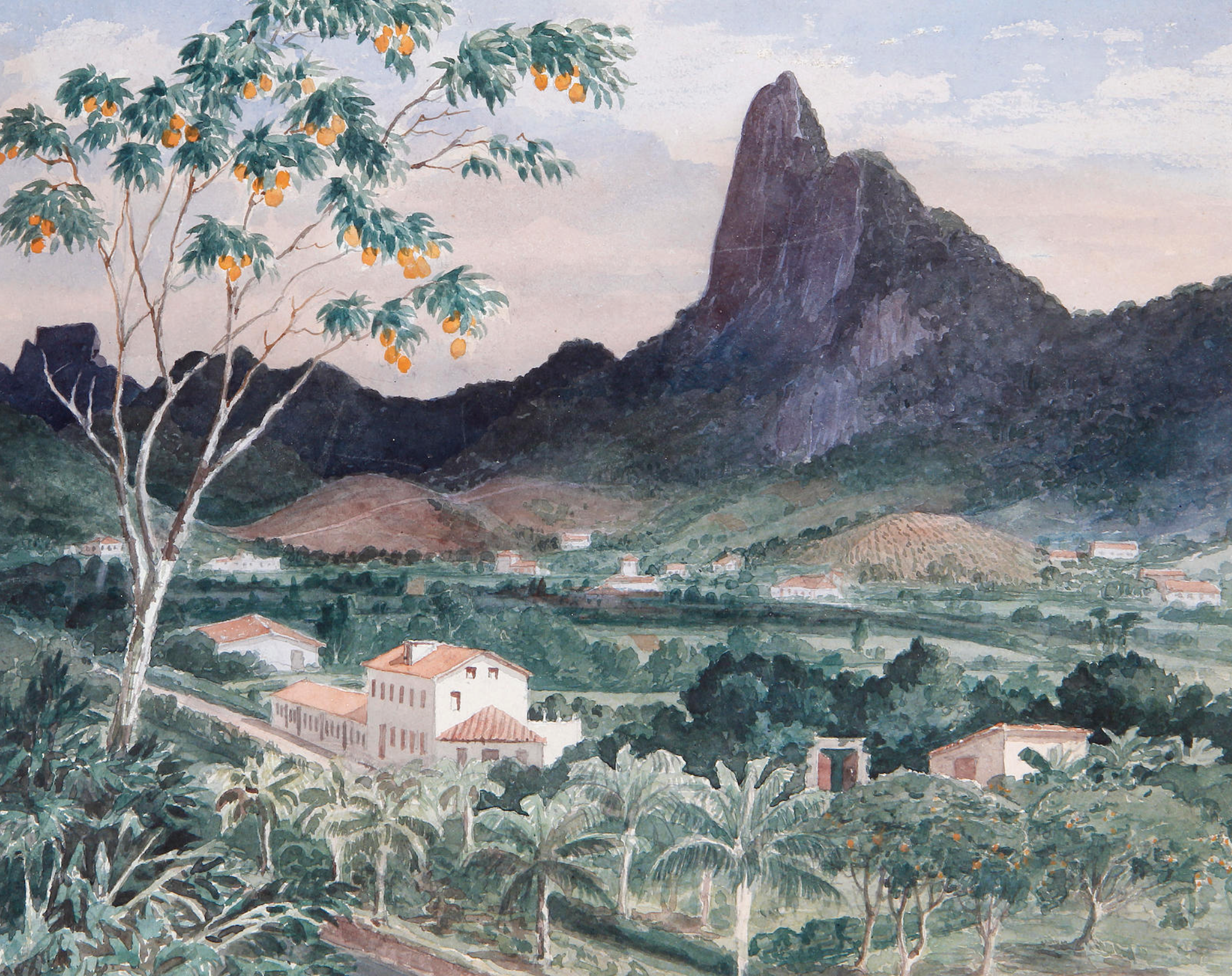
Corcovado mountain (c.1816)

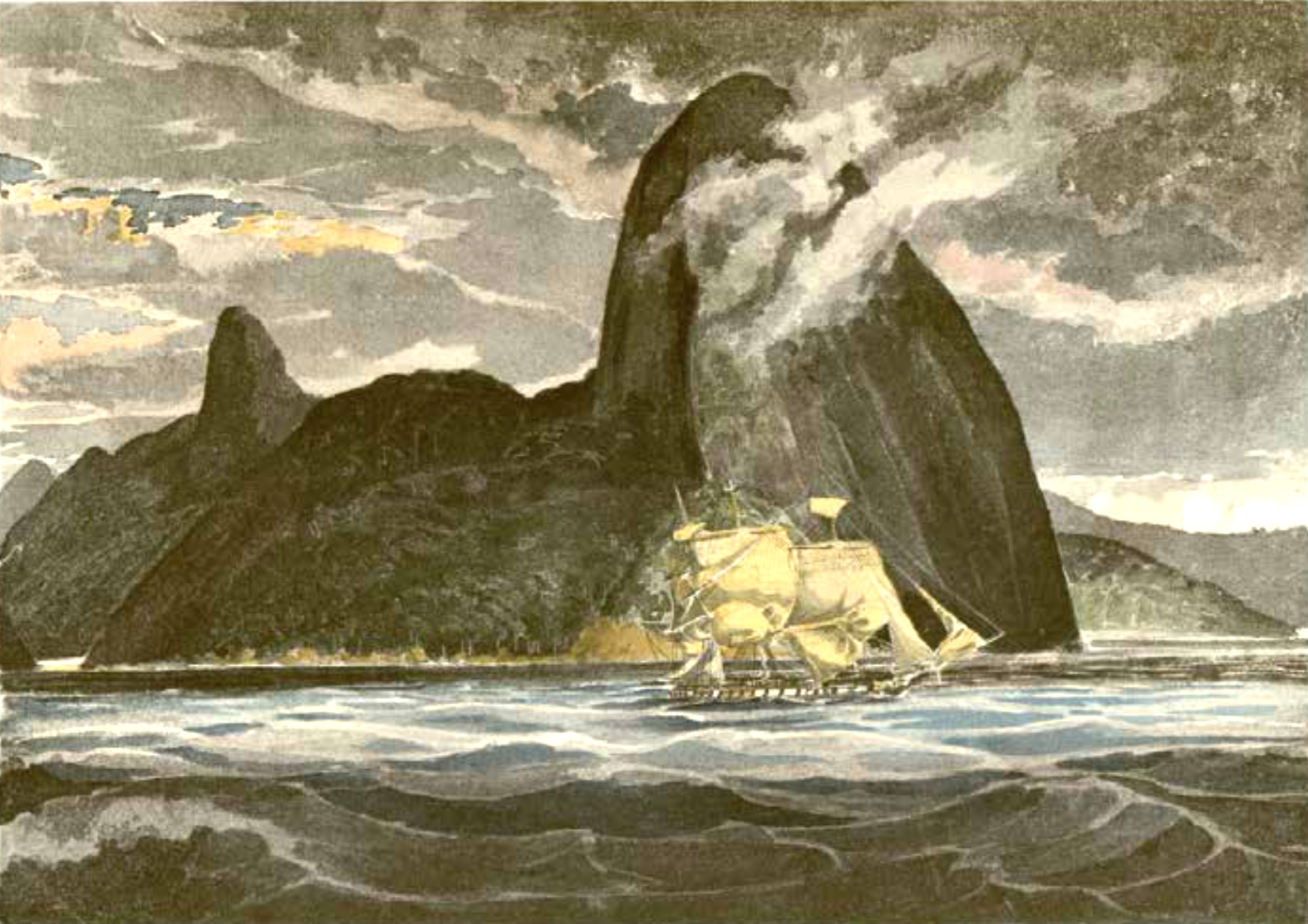
Frigate in a Squall under the Sugar Loaf (1816)

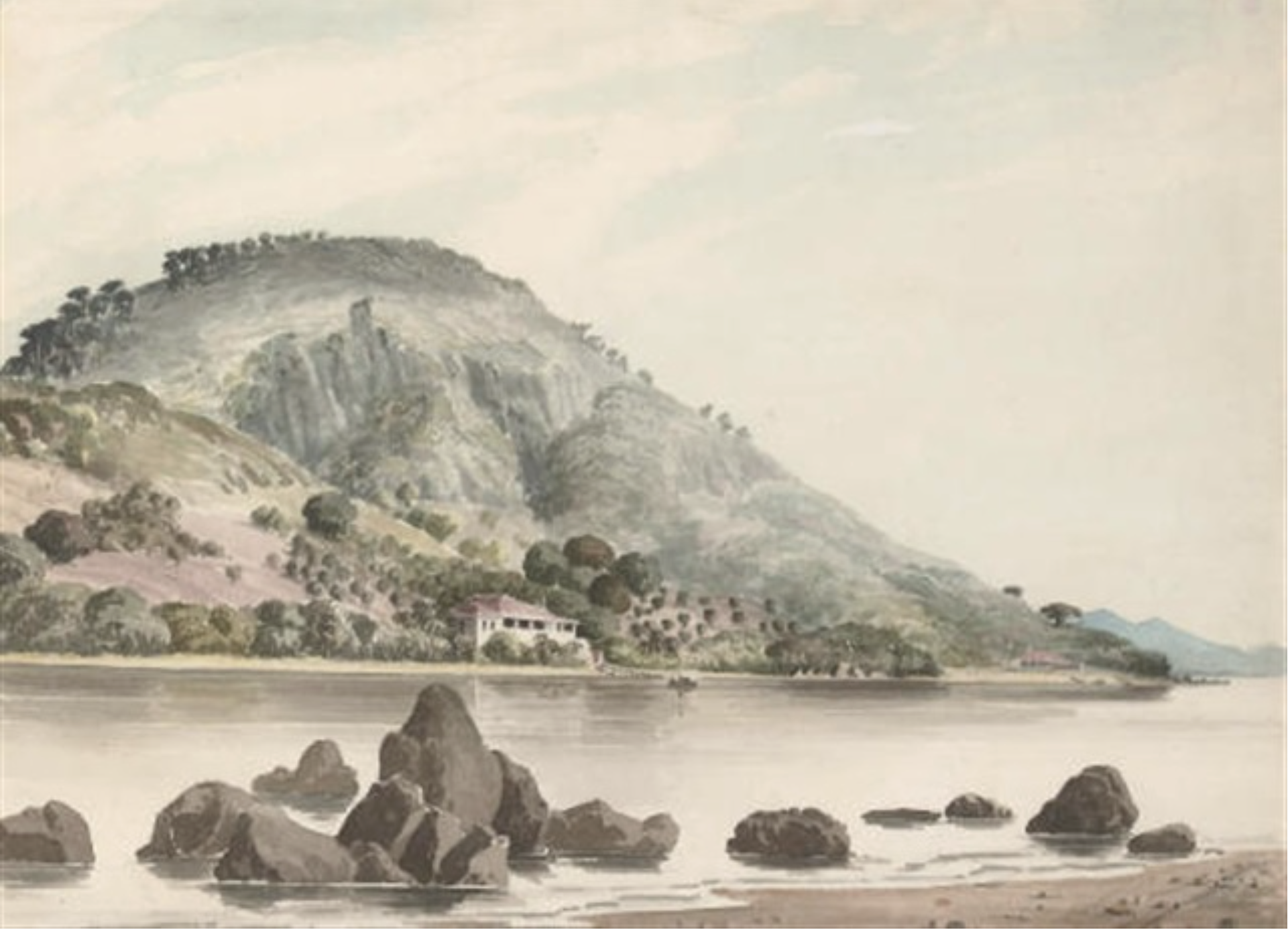
Mr Chamberlain's house, Braganza (1817)

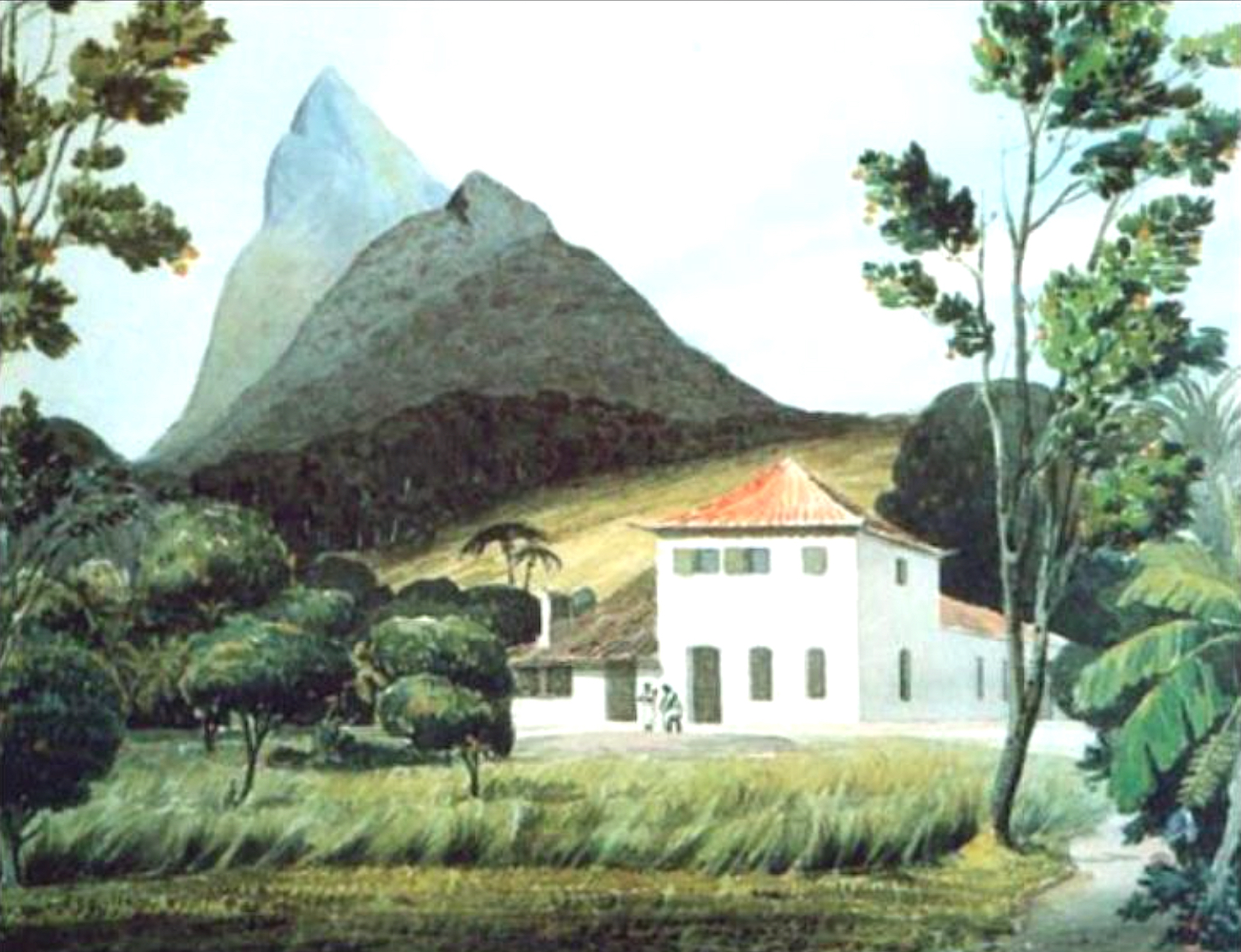
William's Chacra (1818)

The most impressive, not reproduced here, is the densely detailed 600 x 90 cm Panorama of Rio de Janeiro. An Argentine critic wrote that, as a document, it was the most interesting view of Rio de Janeiro in existence.

=== Argentina and Uruguay ===
==== Situation ====
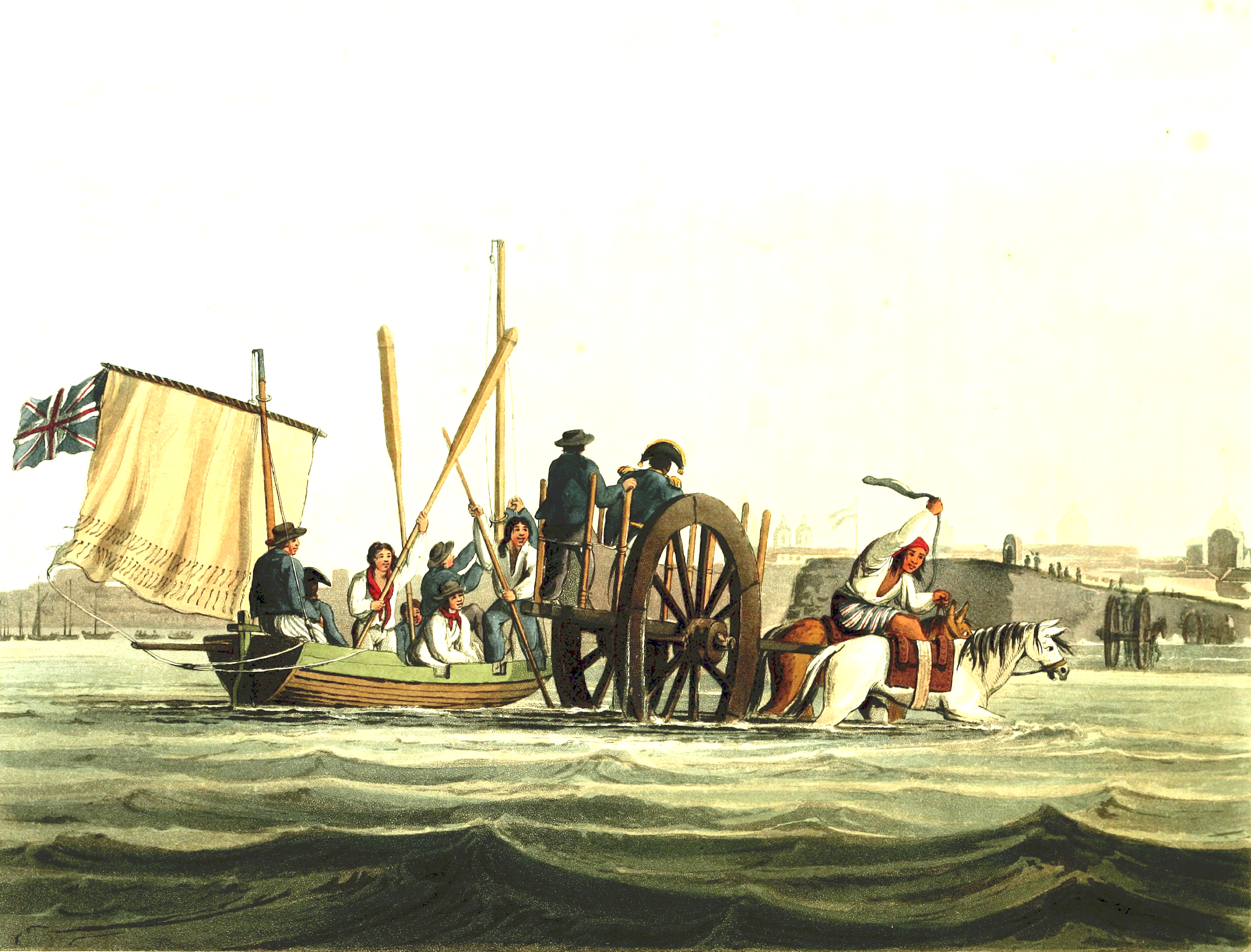
Buenos Aires, c.1820. Despite the port's importance, passengers — here, a British admiral and his secretary — were landed by horse and cart and risked a soaking. "The documentary value of these sketches... cannot be overestimated".

In 1816 Argentina was fighting its war of independence with Spain. Across the River Plate rebellious Uruguay had been invaded by Portuguese/Brazilian forces. In August HMS Hyacinth arrived in Buenos Aires to protect British property. Although based in Rio, such ships came and went; Vidal observed Buenos Aires during the next two years.

Very few painters had visited the region at all. Images of it scarcely existed. Local artists, such as there were, specialised in religious subjects or elite portraiture; they had no motive to paint the ordinary inhabitants and their customs. In contrast, naval officers, "however junior, were encouraged to keep their eyes and ears open, and to take notes on the manners and customs of the native people they might encounter. Governments of the day were largely dependent on the observations of intelligent travellers."

The Buenos Aires that Vidal came to had no splendid scenery to compare with Brazil's, wrote an Argentine critic. "Everything was monotonous, without colour; the immense plain losing itself in the distant horizon. Its architecture was poor and without character." But what Buenos Aires could and did offer him, pictorially, was its human types, their strange implements, their rural and urban tasks and the animals of the Pampas.

That is why the landscape artist within Vidal was transformed into a figure and animal painter — the latter, difficult for a seaman; for if one wants to depict something well, one must observe it often.

But he was, till then, the only one

to give us a truthful representation of what he saw; the first to do it in our city. He drew, maybe not well, but such as they were, the common people; how they dressed, how they moved, their country chores, and the sensation of sadness and poverty they imparted."

Thus it was that Vidal was the first, and for a time, the only artist to paint the everyday scenes of life in Buenos Aires and Uruguay. Wrote S. Samuel Trifilo:

The documentary value of these sketches, in bringing a visual representation of some characteristic scenes and types of Old Buenos Aires, cannot be overestimated. As stated by Cordero, the water colors "constitute the best document of its kind to acquaint us with the characteristics of Buenos Aires during the first decade of the national period."

==== Gallery: four contrasting types ====
Twenty-four Vidal watercolours were afterwards published — as hand-coloured aquatints with an accompanying text — by London publisher Rudolph Ackermann under the title Picturesque Illustrations of Buenos Ayres and Monte Video (1820). Four of those prints are reproduced in this section:

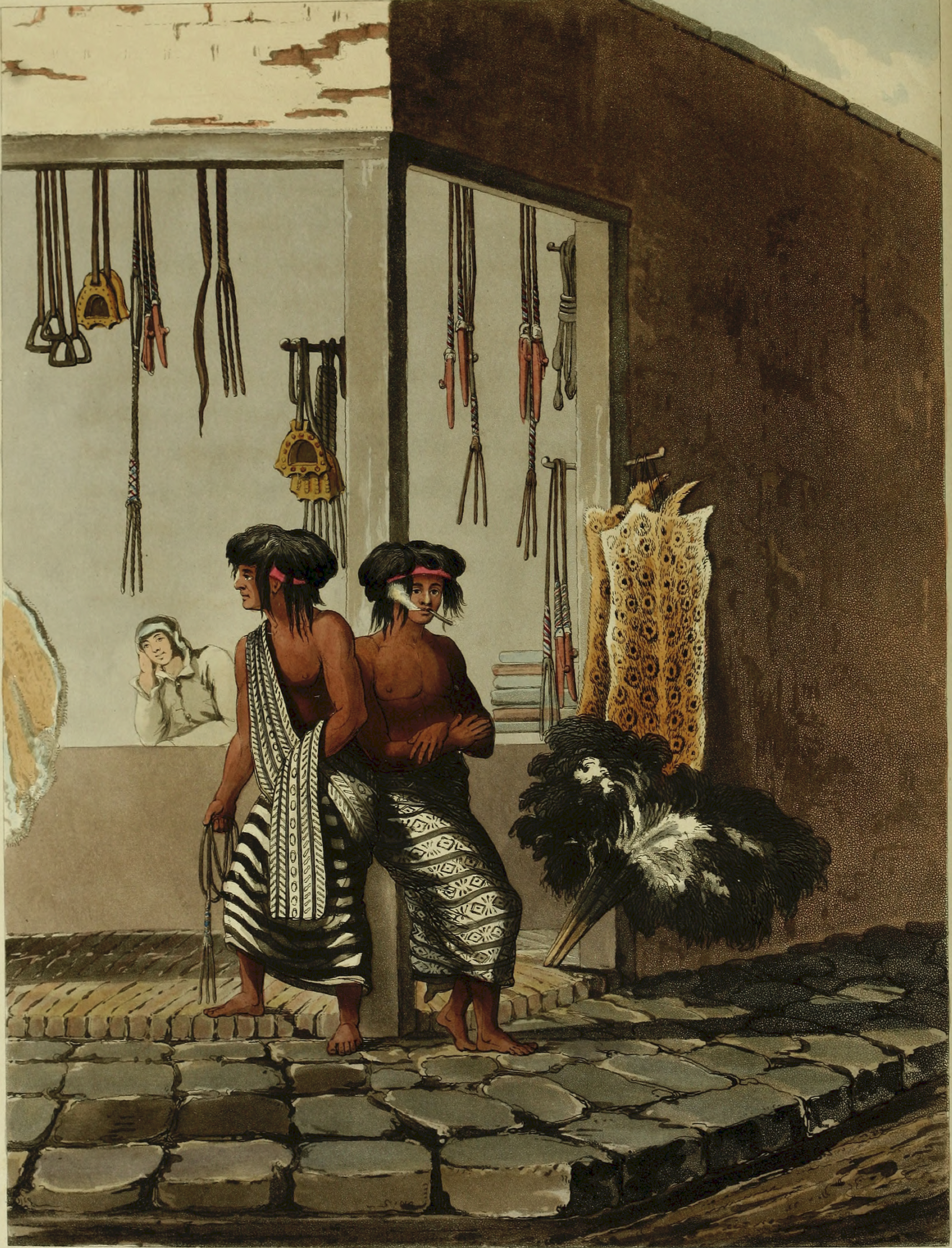
1. Visiting Indians

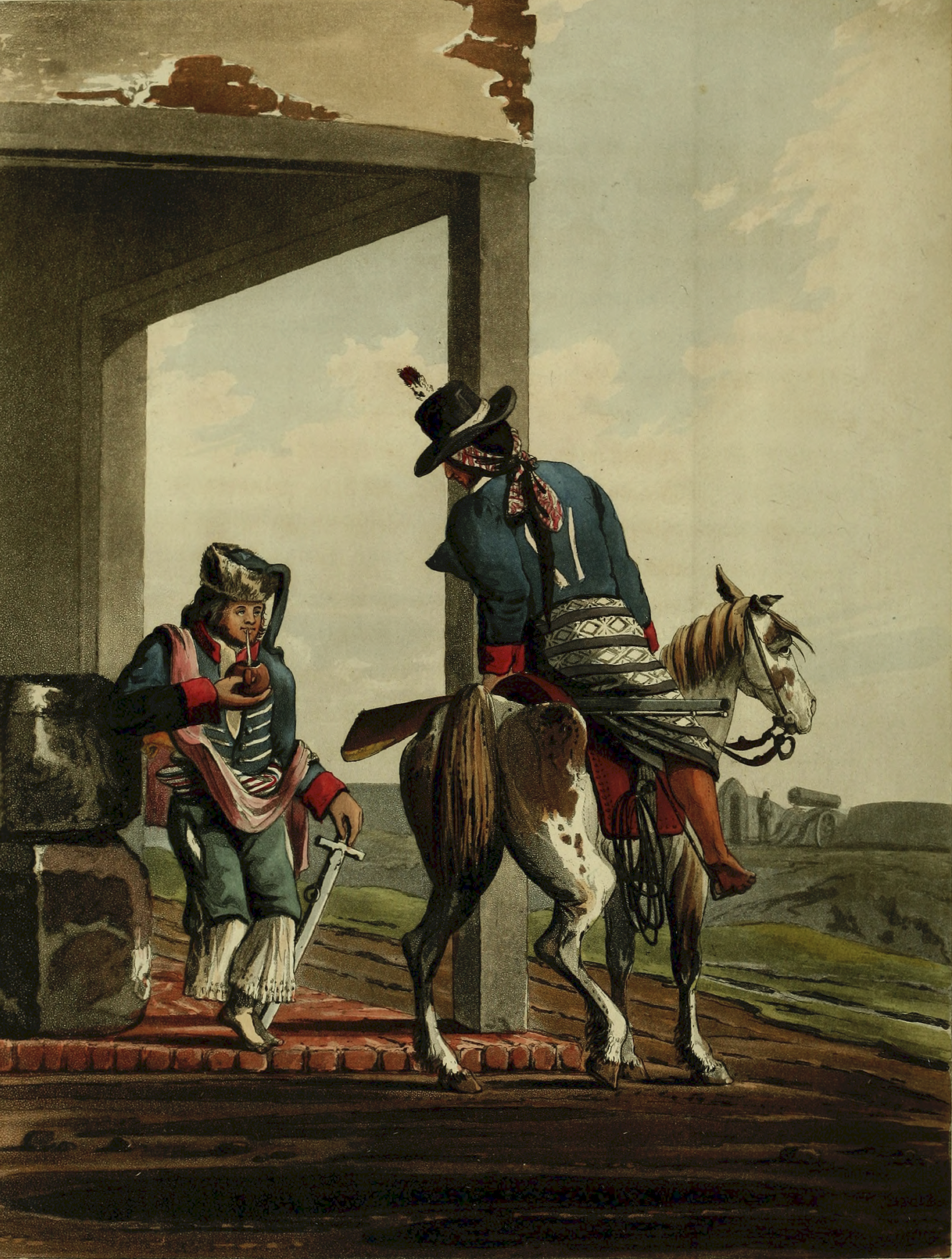
2. 'Paolistas'

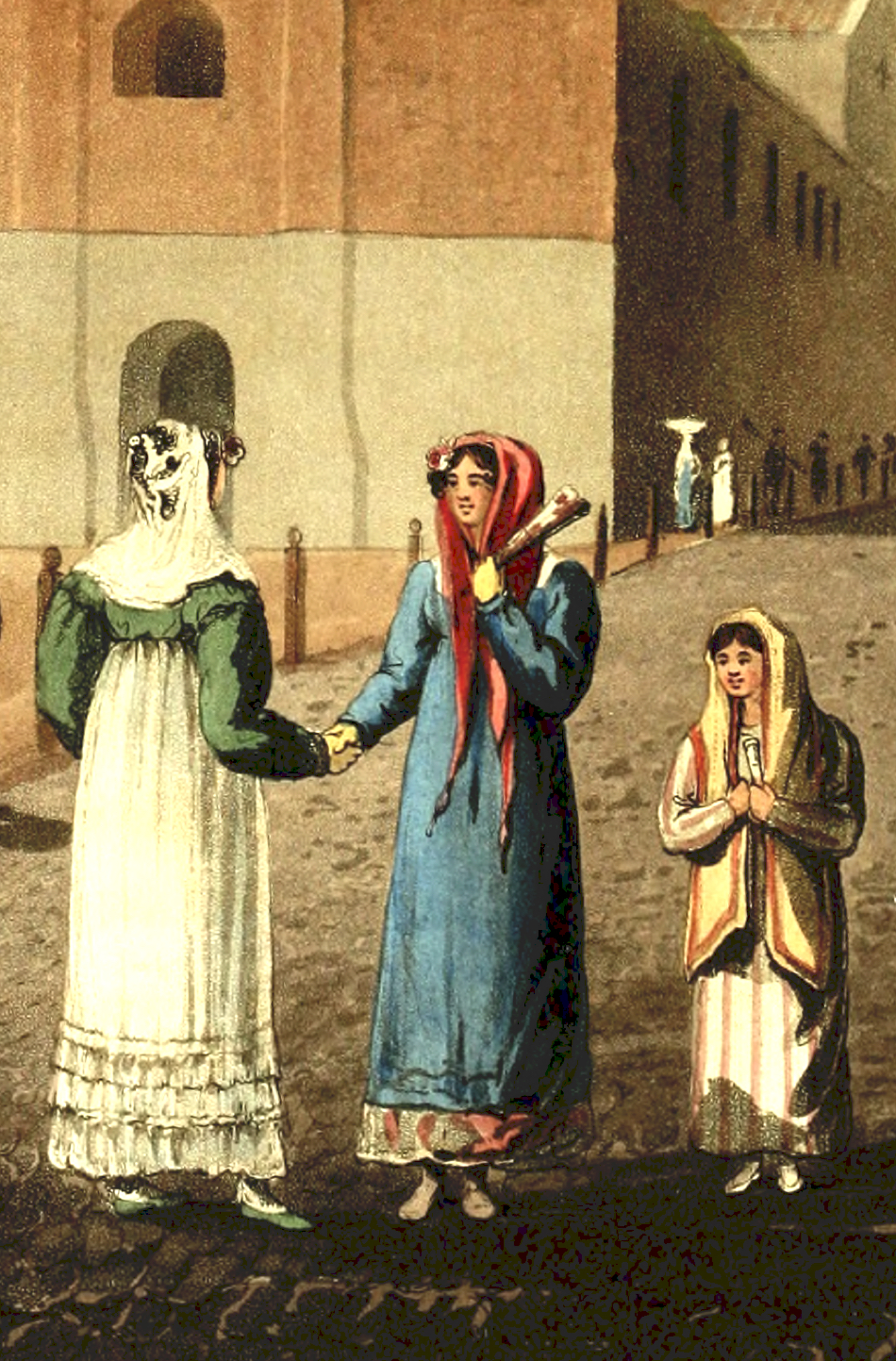
3. Fashion

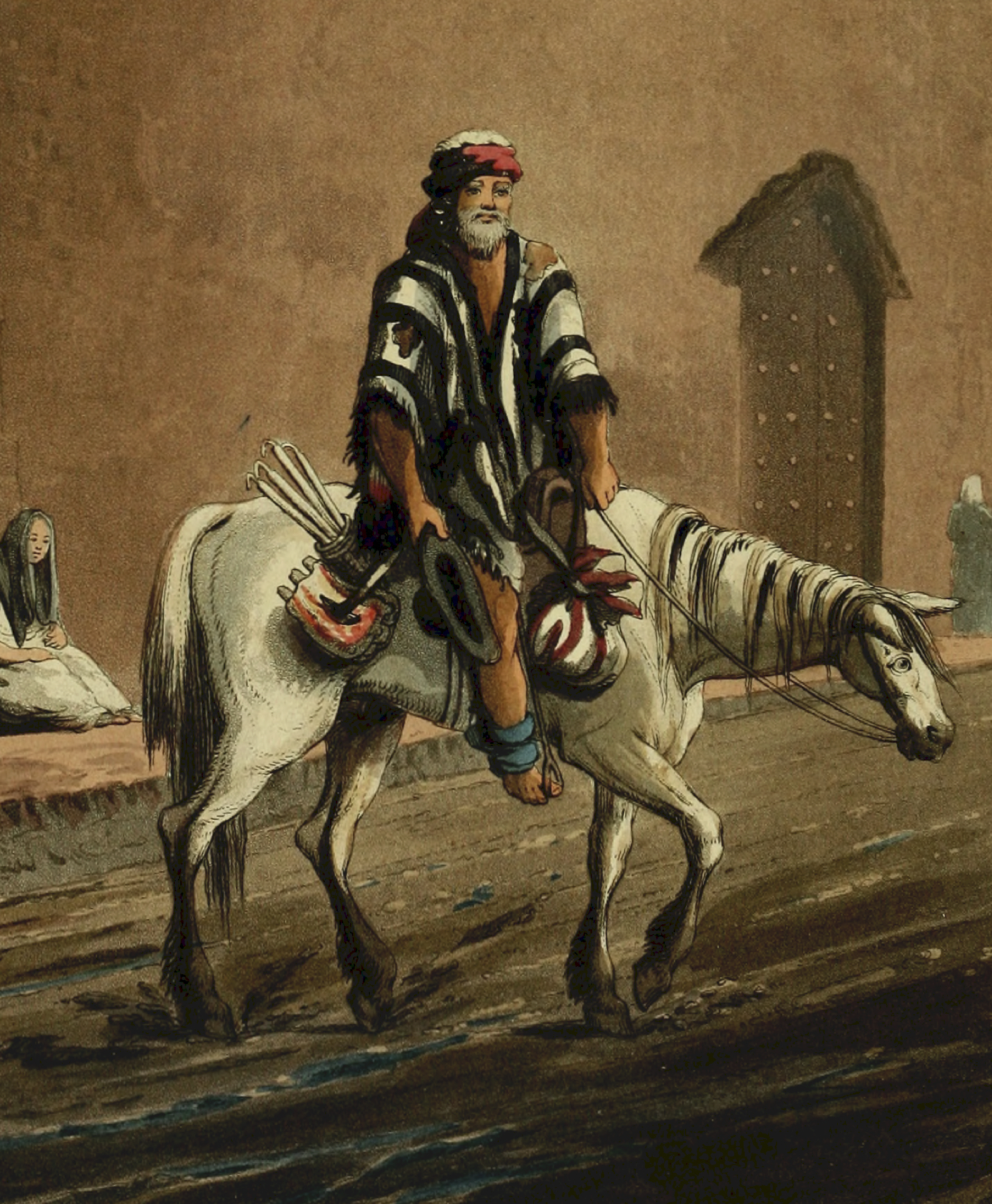
4. Beggar
1. Indigenous people of the Pampas nation on a trading visit to Buenos Aires. They have come to sell ponchos, tiger-cat skins, baskets, panniers, bridles, stirrups, colt-skin boots, and ostrich-feather dusters ("there is always one in every room in Buenos Ayres"). Within 50 years their nation will be extinct.
2. Gaucho cavalrymen in Uruguay. It is not clear whether they are Brazilian gaúchos in the service of Portugal, or Uruguayans fighting for local patriot José Gervasio Artigas. (Note: The caption "Paolistas" would make them Brazilian; but it may have been added by Ackermann without Vidal's authorisation. The text on page 108 — one of the pages Vidal did not disadvow (González Garaño 1933, pp. 26–27) — says: "The protracted war maintained by these soldiers against both the Portuguese and the Buenos Ayres Union...", which makes them Artiguistas. The text on page 109 says they are at a pulpería in Montevideo, at that time in Portuguese control; however, Vidal complained the Ackermann had interfered with that page.) They are drinking yerba mate; probably the first depiction of this South American custom. Notice the horse has one ear cut off — to keep down theft of army property. "Living habitually in the open air, sleeping with their horses, requiring no food but beef, for which they drive the living animals before them, leaving a desert to their enemies..."
3. Elite women in Buenos Aires. From Church of San Domingo (detail). "The mode of salutation among the ladies in public is shaking hands — an honour never granted publicly to gentlemen."
4. A beggar plying his calling on horseback (detail). "He accosts you with assurance and a roguish smile; jokes on the leanness of his horse, which, he says, is too old to walk; hopes for your compassion, and wishes you may live a thousand years."

==== The criollo horse ====
Vidal's horse drawings might seem quaint and somewhat deficient, almost caricatures; but an Argentine horse expert has denied this, saying "Vidal's suite of watercolours about the River Plate horse .. always show it with the same type characteristics that we find in pure bred specimens today, 100 years later". Criollo horses were small but tough.

==== The Cabildo then and today ====
Few buildings that Vidal saw on that visit survive. An exception is the historic Buenos Aires Cabildo (city hall), the first in South America to defy the Spanish empire (1810). It can be discerned in his The Plaza, or Great Square of Buenos Ayres, left background. It may be compared with the present-day building, truncated by street development.

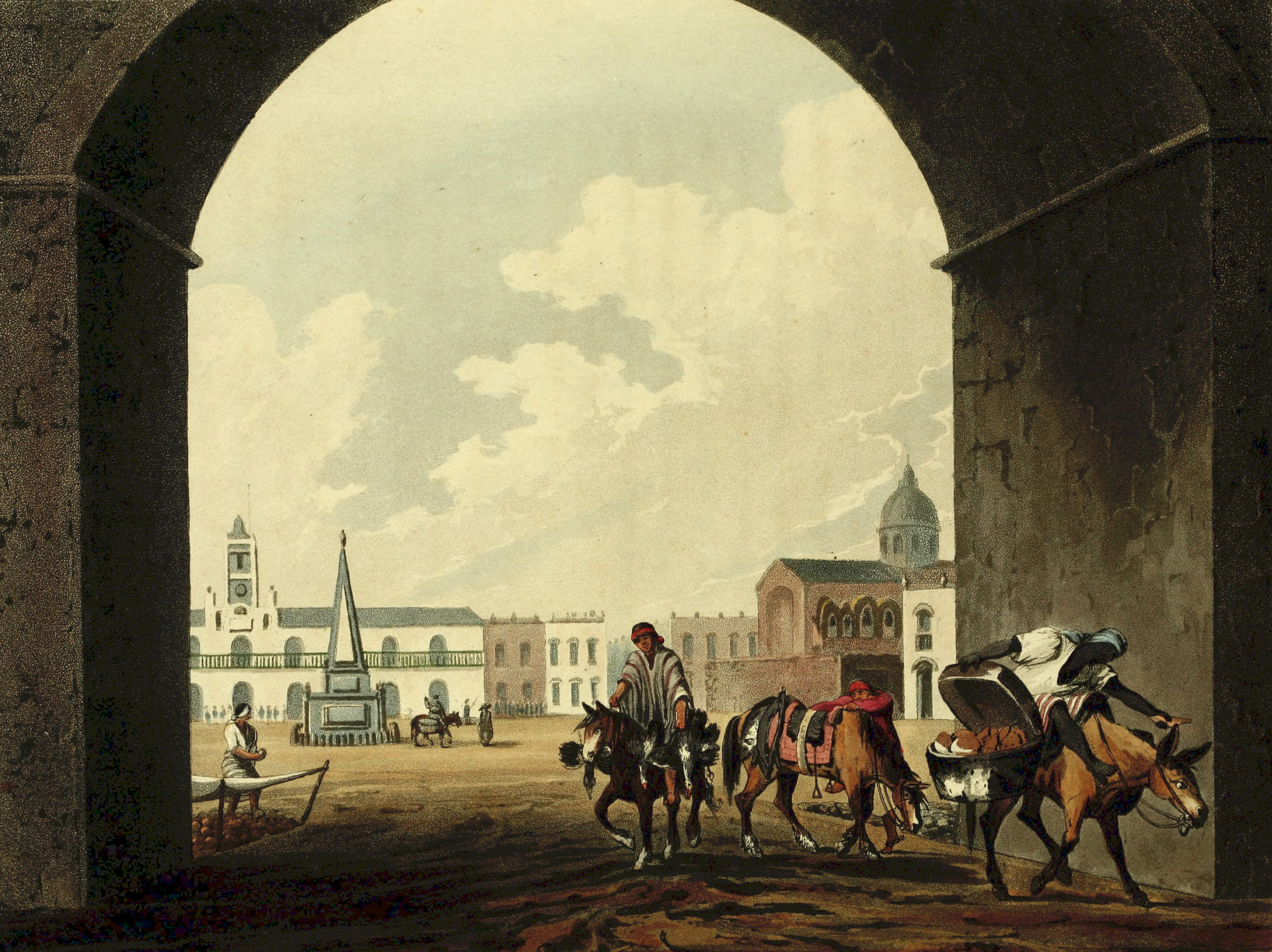
The Plaza, or Great Square (print), see Cabildo in left distance

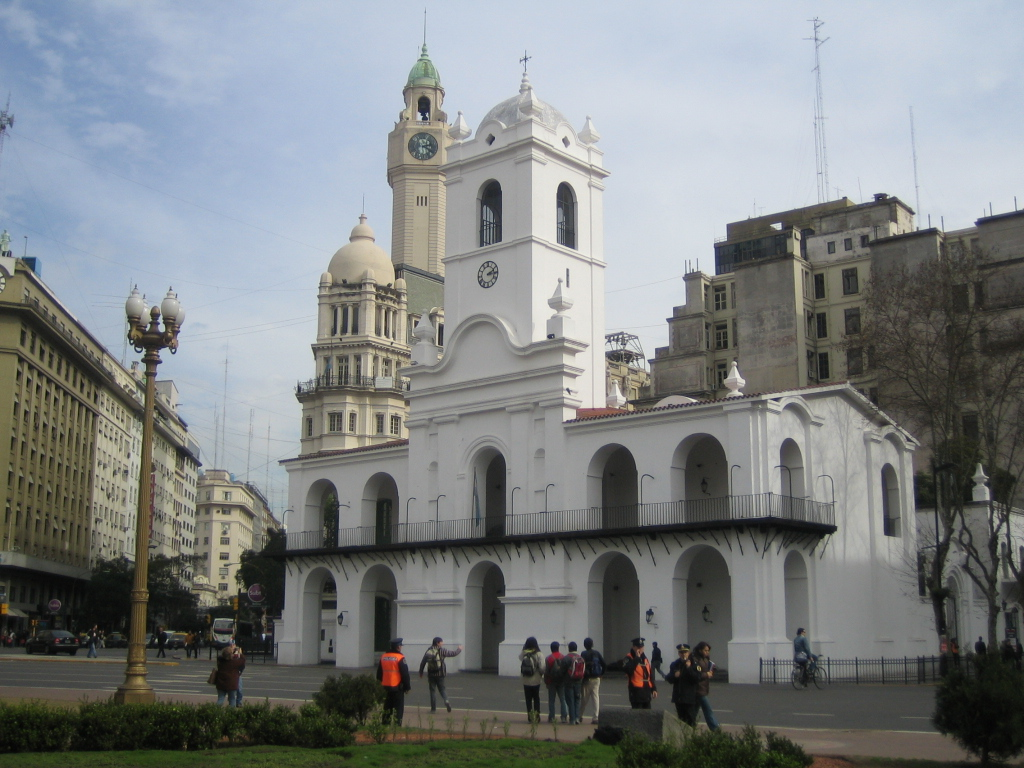
Cabildo de Buenos Aires, modern photograph

"In the annexed view", wrote Vidal, "the quinteros (farmers) are seen coming to the market from the country.. They carry their live animals, tied by the heels and thrown over their horses' backs... A baker's man, a negro-slave, is introduced; and here it may be observed, that slavery at Buenos Ayres is perfect freedom compared with that among other nations... the treatment of slaves [is] highly honourable to the Spanish character."

==== Gallery: local types and scenes ====
Vidal's images are a seemingly inexhaustible source of information, their detail continually examined by historiographers. (Note: They have been explored for the light they throw on, for example, the tasajo trade (Sluyter 2010, p. 105); the economics of pulperías (Slatta 1982, pp. 347–362); local aversion for manual labour, unless by Afro-Argentines (Andrews 1979, p. 22); and the market for Indian manufactures in nineteenth century Buenos Aires (Suárez 2004, pp. 28, 29)) All these are Ackermann's prints.

(To see a sequence of enlarged views, click on any one of them, then scroll by selecting the left or right arrow.)
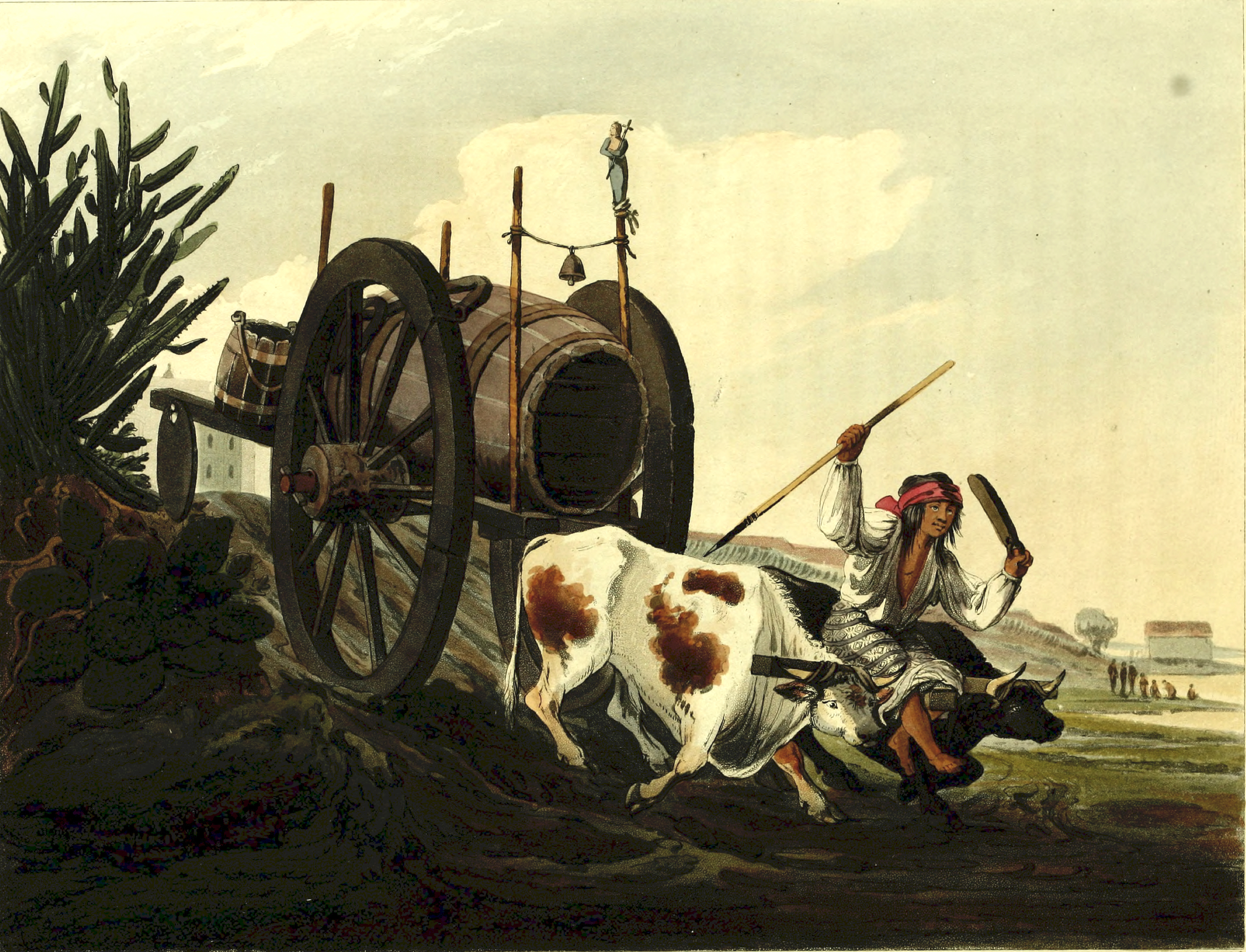
1. Water cart

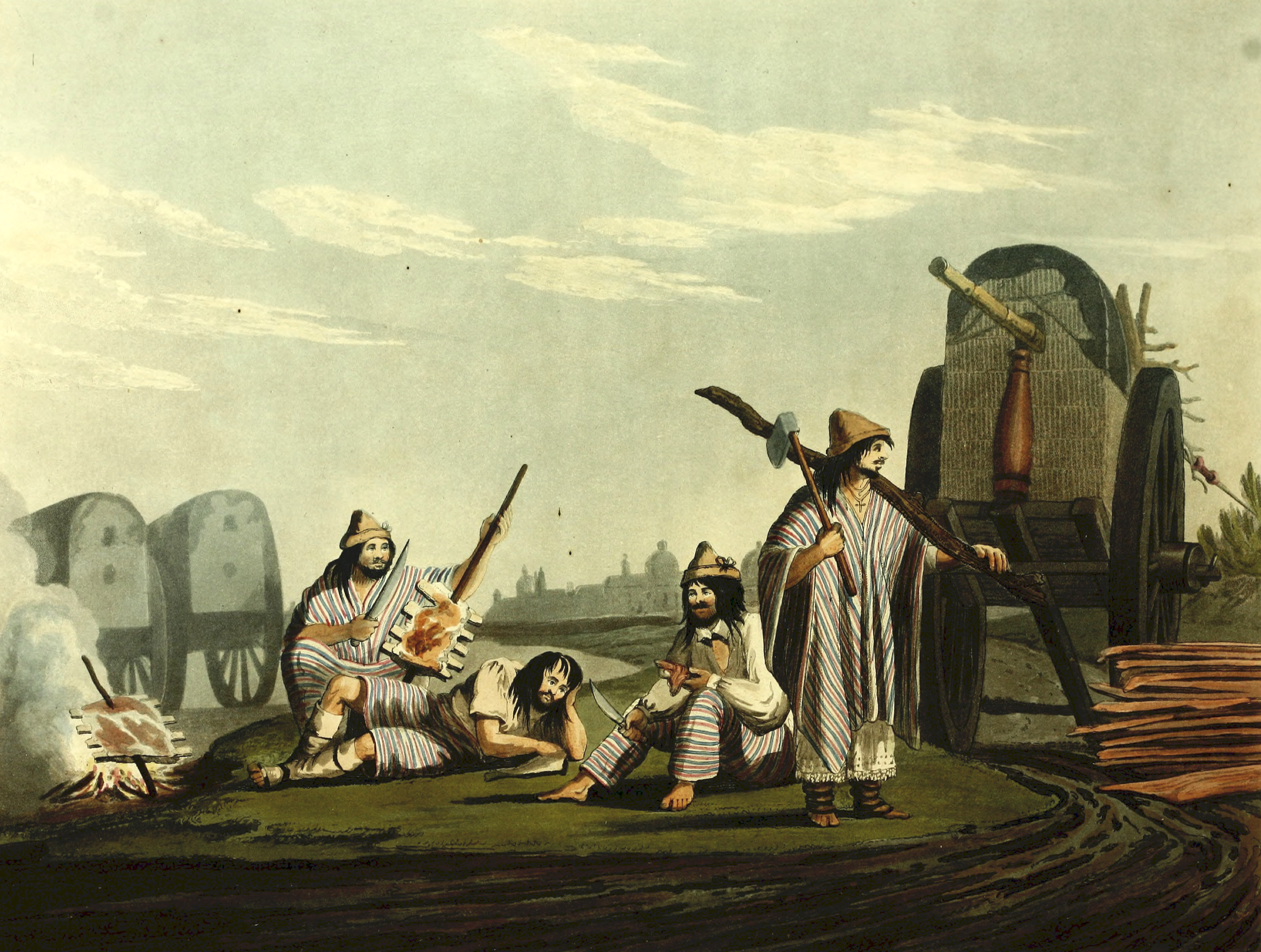
2. Tucumán gauchos

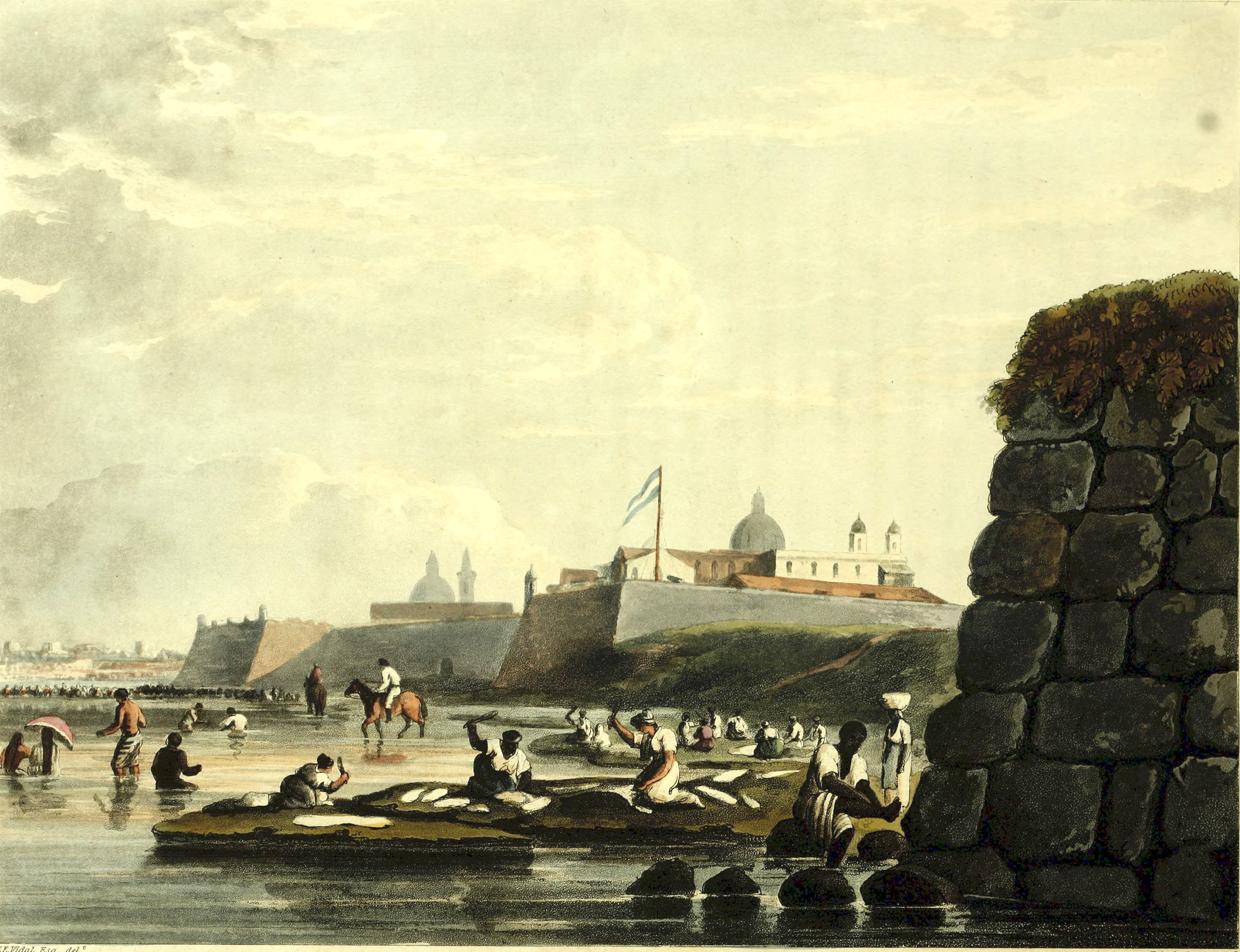
3. The fort

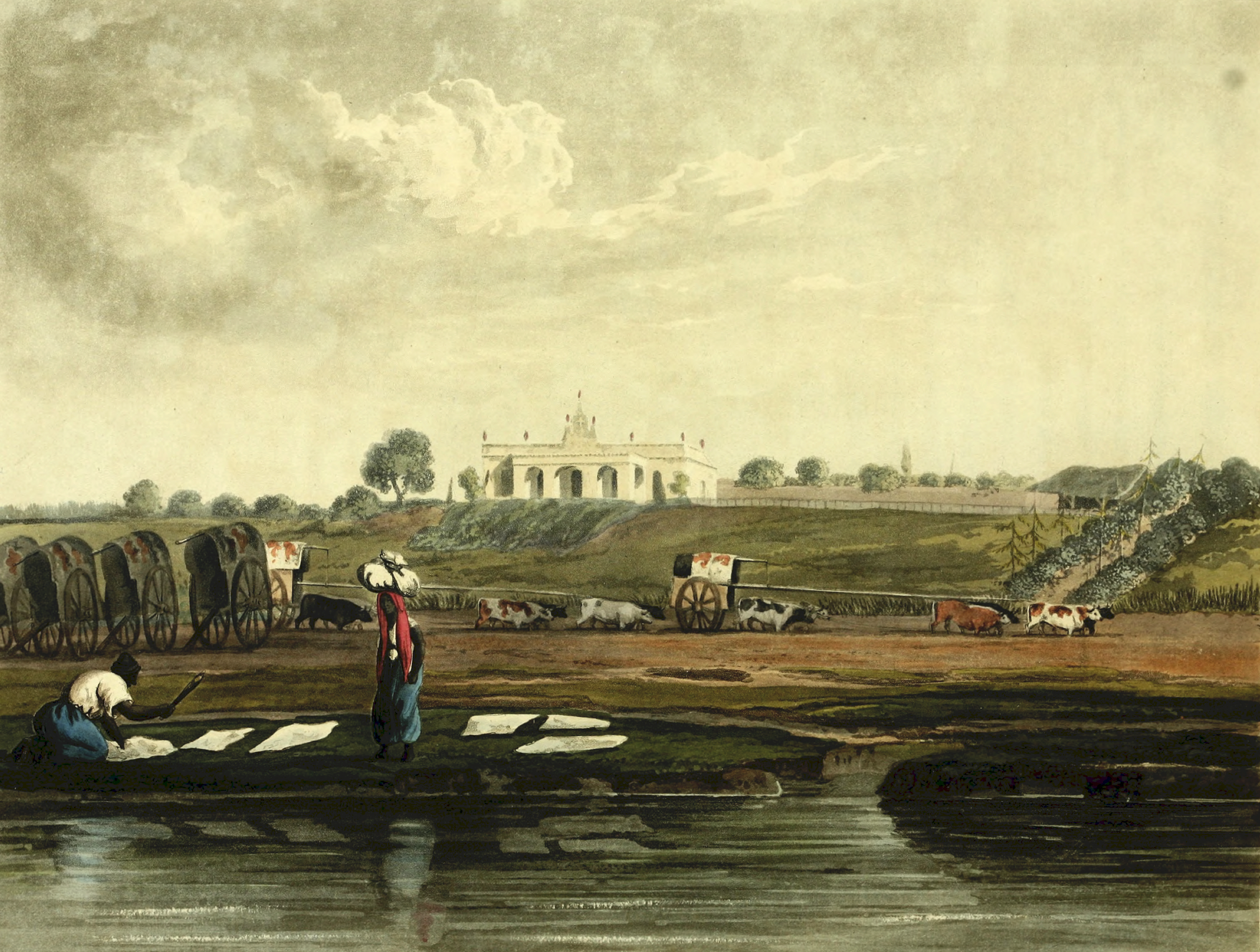
4. Country estate

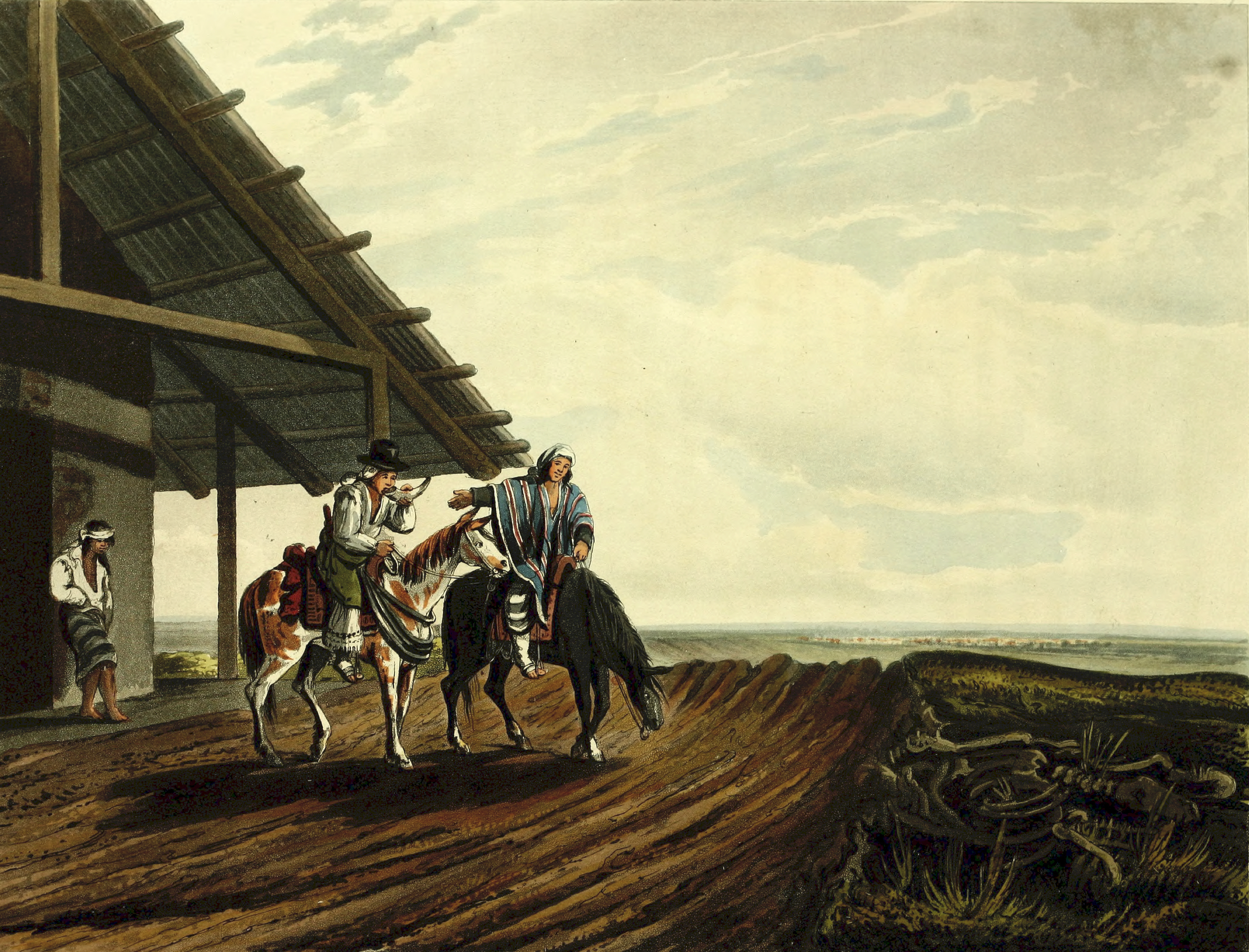
5. Country store

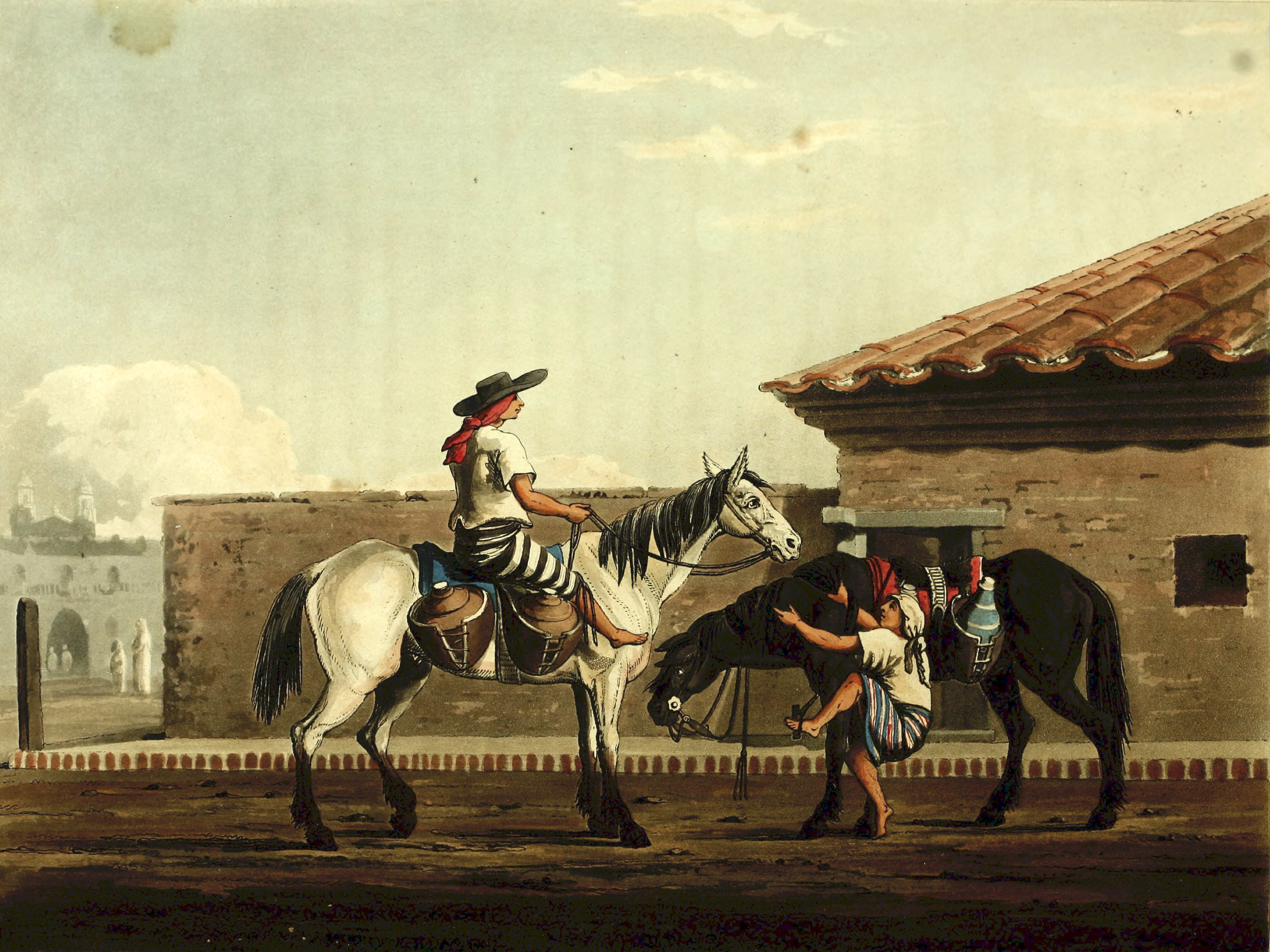
6. Milk boys

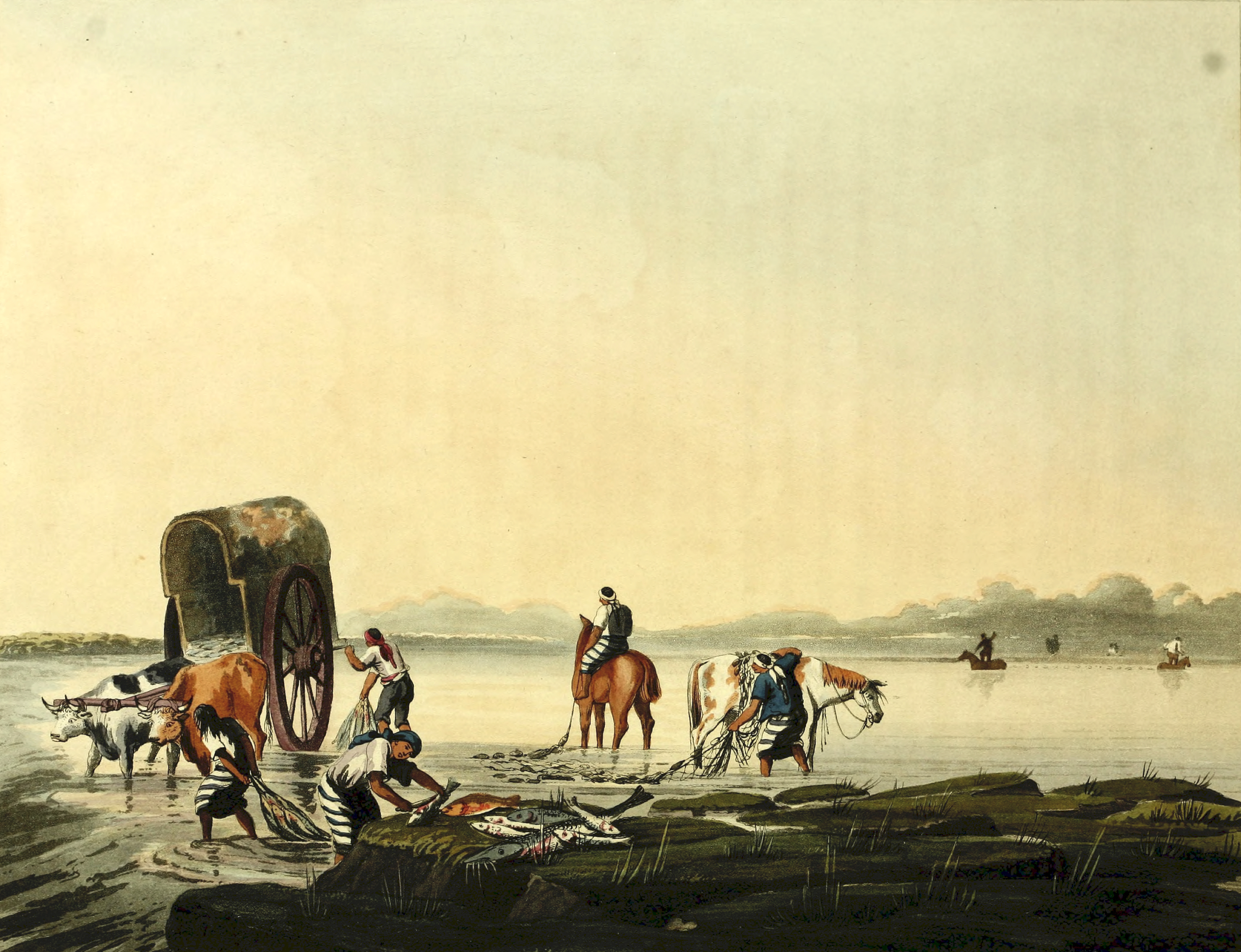
7. Gauchos fishing

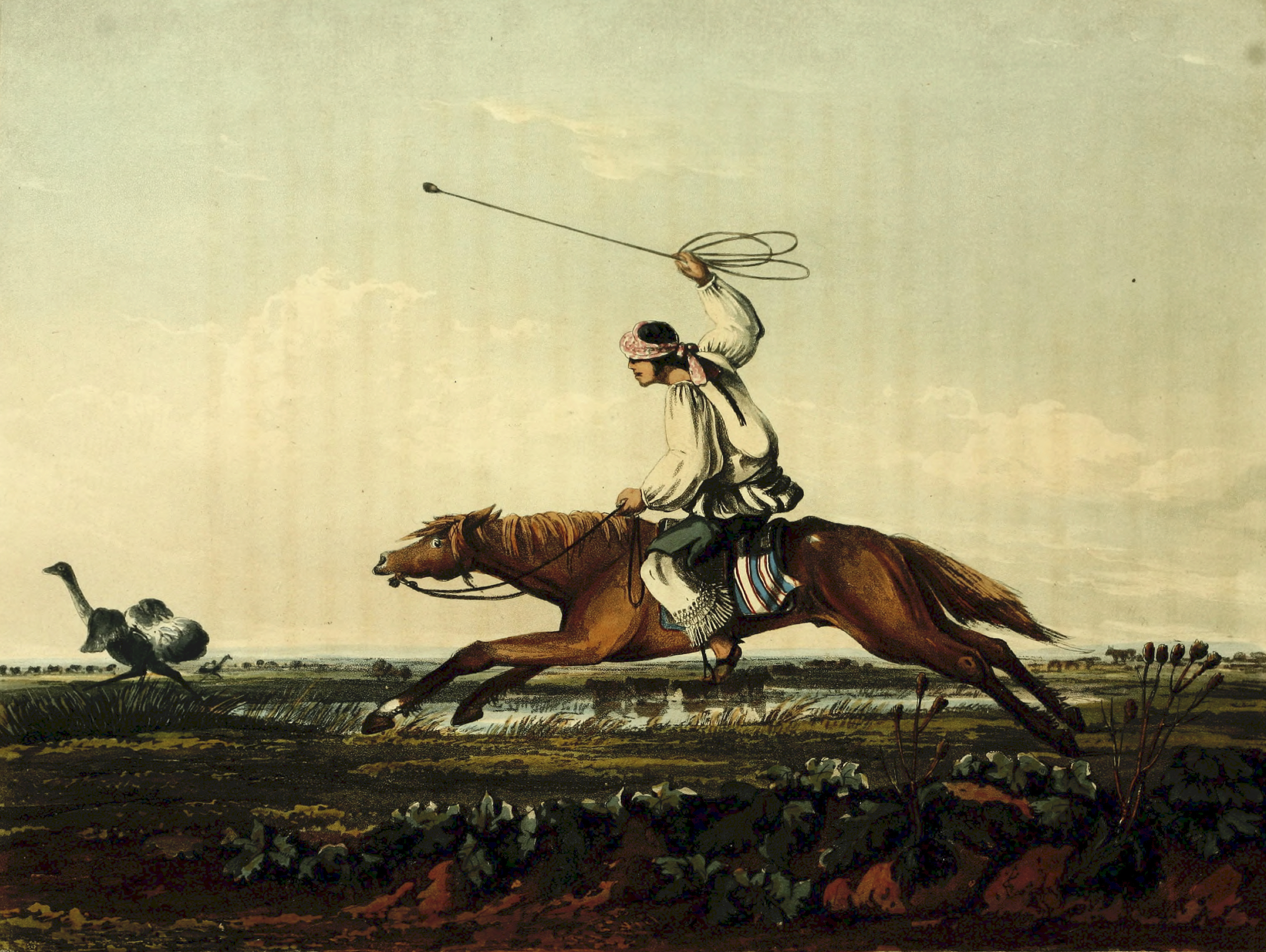
8. Ostrich chase

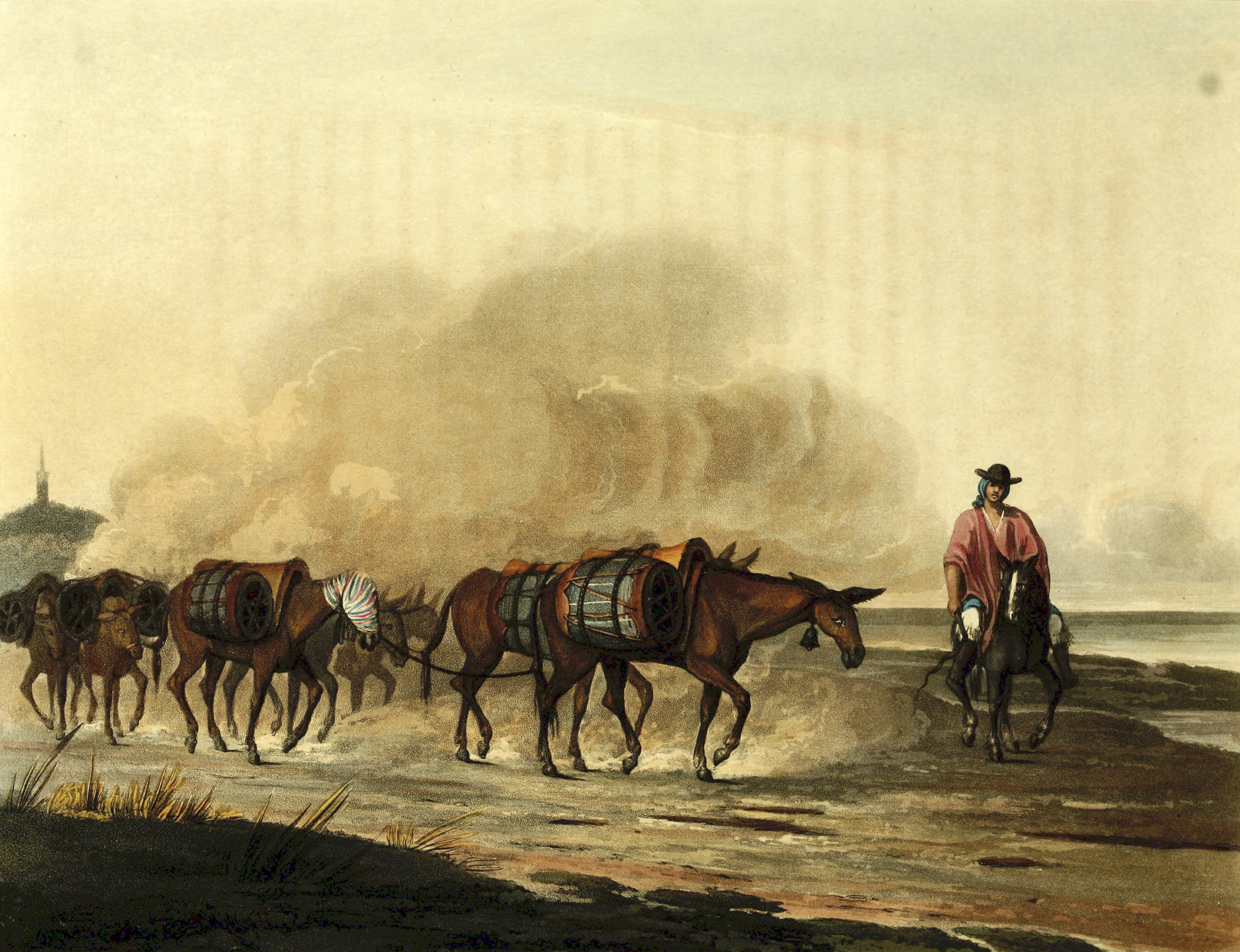
9. Wine mules

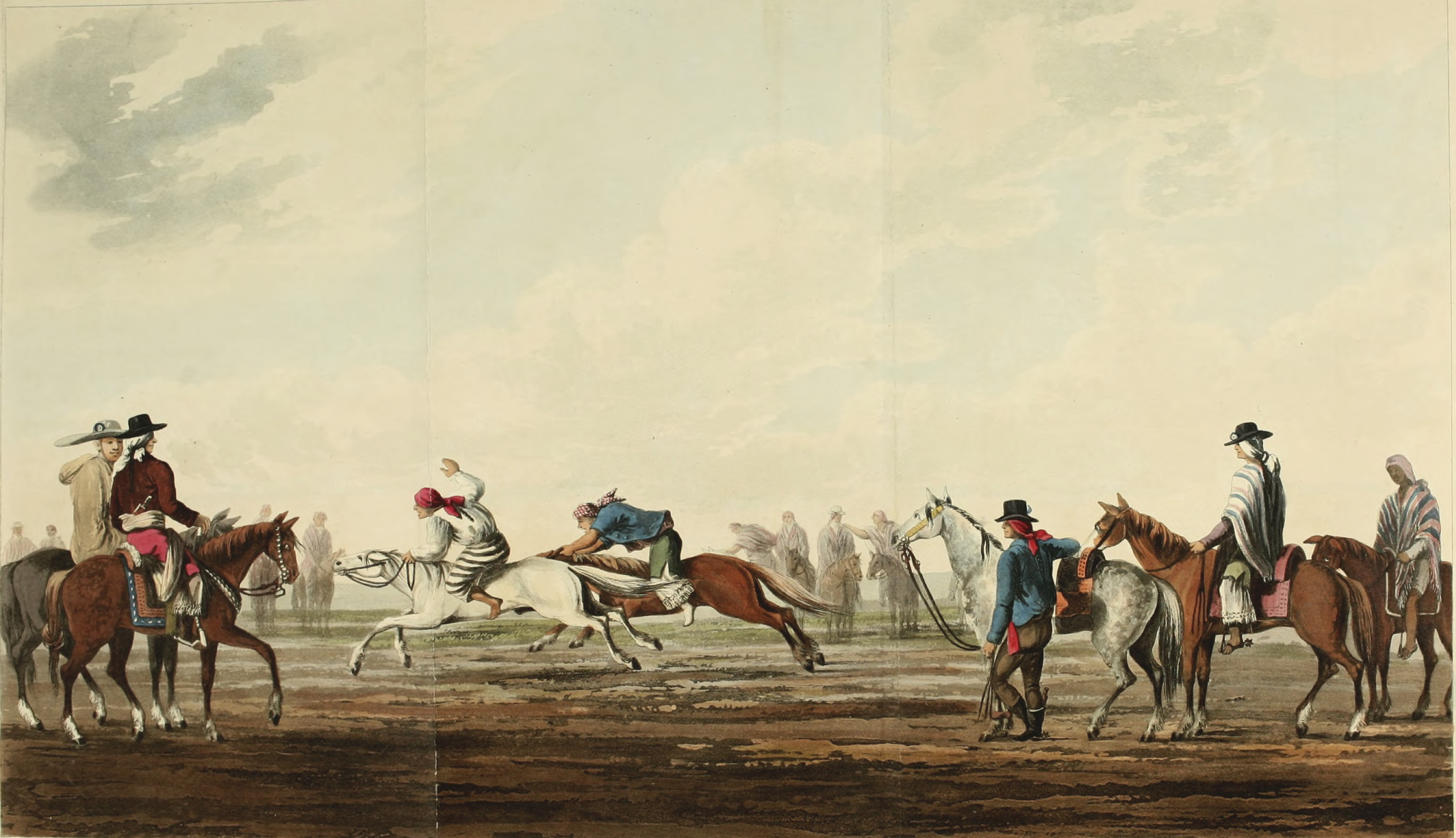
10. Horse race

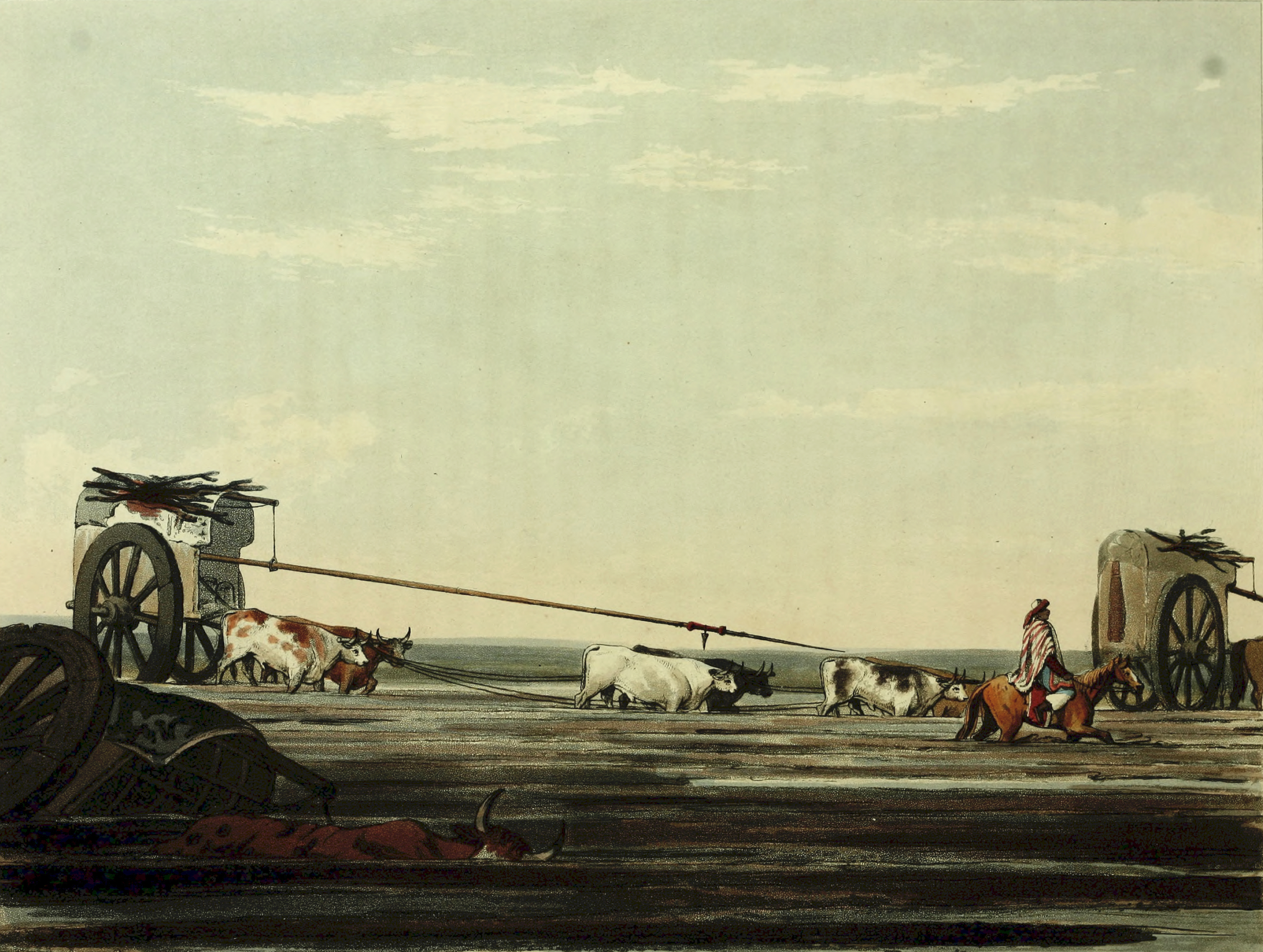
11. Oxen in quagmire

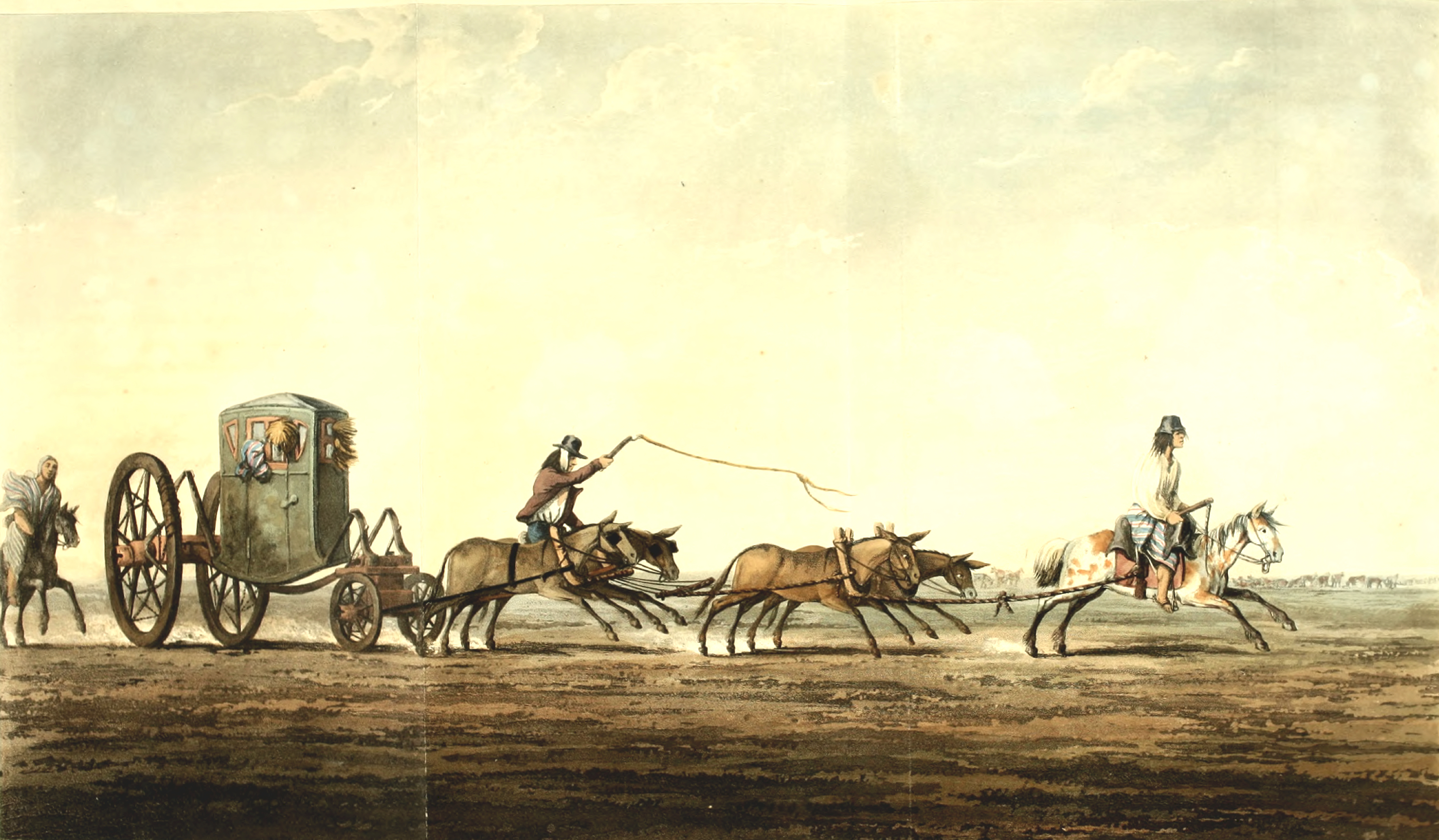
12. Mail coach
1. The water vendor drives his oxen over the river bank to refill his cart, goading them all the time and beating their horns with a mallet. "Wretched beyond description is the lot of the water-cart oxen."
2. Gauchos from up-country Tucumán with their characteristic striped ponchos. Unlike their Buenos Aires counterparts, wrote Vidal, they had pure Spanish features.
3. The fort (citadel) and the river bank. "Here men and women bathe promiscuously, but without scandal", while hundreds of washerwomen beat clothes.
4. A country estate about a mile from the town (present day Vicente López). An enormous ombú tree provides shade. "They are fenced with a good hedge of aloes, which bloom in great beauty every summer". It has been said to be the property of George Frederick Dickson a British merchant.
5. Gauchos at a country store. Gauchos went everywhere on horseback. "They scarcely know how to walk, and will not if they can help it, though it were only to cross the street. When they meet at the pulpería [country store], or anywhere else, they remain on horseback, though the conversation may last several hours." "They are extremely hospitable; they furnish any traveller that applies to them with lodging and food, and scarcely ever think of inquiring who he is, or whither he is going, even though he may remain with them for several months."
6. Milk boys. Small children, they "ride most furiously", run races, water their milk — just like their London colleagues, said Vidal — and gamble away the profits. "Generally the children of the small farmers, badly clothed and miserably dirty, but lively, and mischievous as monkeys, teaching their docile horses as many tricks."
7. Gauchos fishing. A pair wade their horses out chest-deep, then turn them apart and draw a net, all the time standing on their backs.
8. Chasing ostriches (Note: The "ostrich" is a ñandú (Rhea americana).) with bolas — a weapon that could throw any horse, bull or man. Vidal's London publisher took liberties with this watercolour: the engraver omitted one of the two balls.
9. Wine mules in convoys of hundreds, bringing their barrels from Mendoza province in the Andes foothills, a 740 mile journey through wild country. Notice the poncho over one animal's eyes.
10. A horse race brings out the local passion for gambling, shared by the friar on the left. An Old Spaniard defiantly wears his national colours, for which he is taxed as a counter-revolutionary, insultingly called a godo (Goth).
11. Oxcart attempting to traverse a quagmire. If an ox falls, either it gets up or it is cut loose and (foreground) left to drown.
12. Mail coach pulled by mules "constantly driven at a gallop, so long as nature can endure the fatigue", and led by a horse. Riding the horse is a Chino Indian: no other picture is known.

The over-abundance of animals led to their abuse, wrote Vidal. "The human being who to his fellow-man is hospitable and compassionate, is to his beast the most barbarous of tyrants".

==== The central market ====
Alejo González Garaño, the foremost Vidal collector, thought The Market Place of Buenos Ayres best evoked the old city.

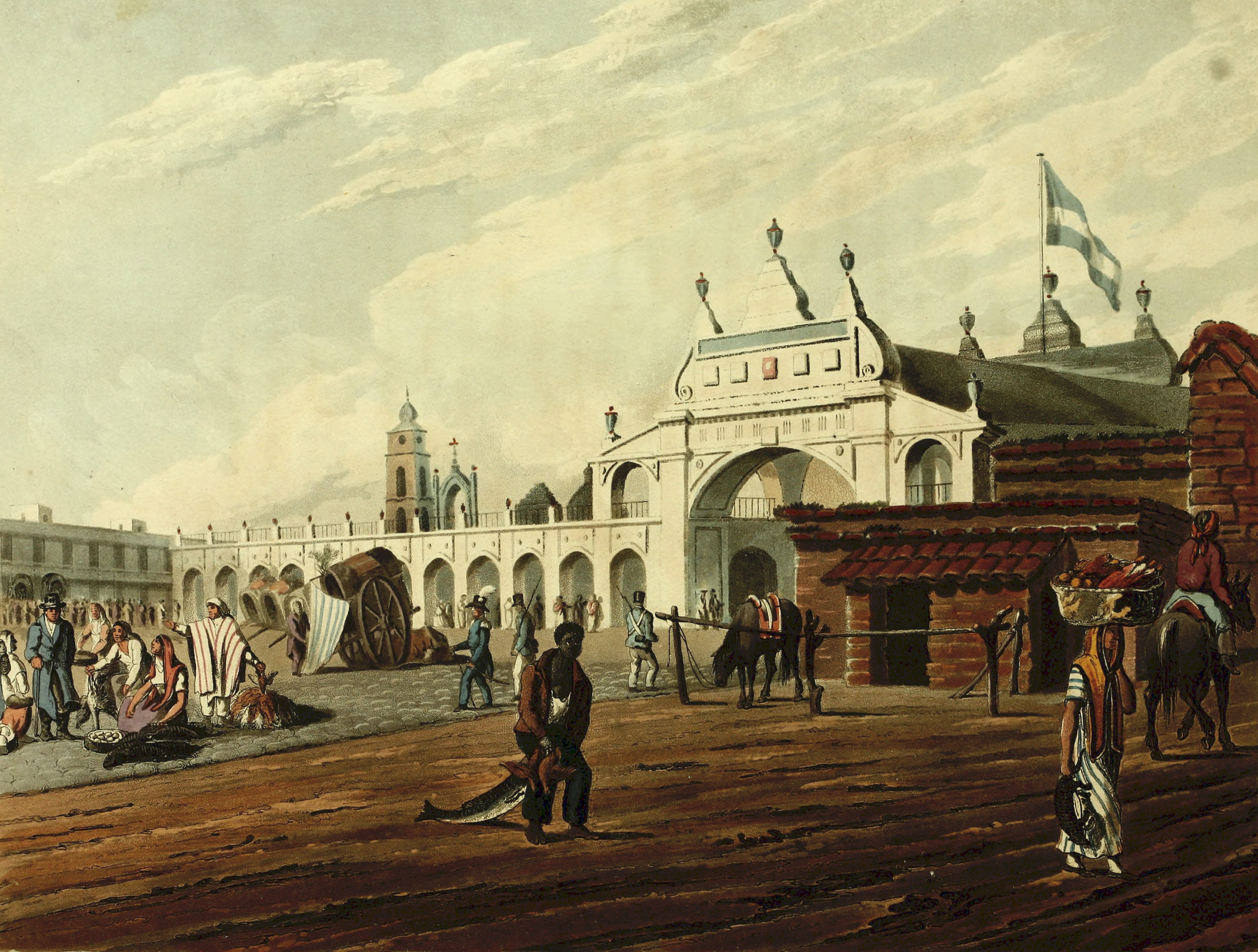
"Ladies never go to market; gentlemen sometimes take the trouble; but in general it is left to a servant, or rather a confidential slave. Two of these are seen in the foreground with their provision for the day, of which two articles are remarkable — partridges and armadillos... delicious eating." The new Argentine flag flies above — the first visual record of it we have. Notice the basket woman's right hand. At centre is a British admiral escorted by two Argentine soldiers; on left, bargaining for eggs, is his secretary — presumably Vidal himself. (Note: Compare the pair arriving by horse and cart in the title image.)

==== San Isidro: a different kind of watercolour ====
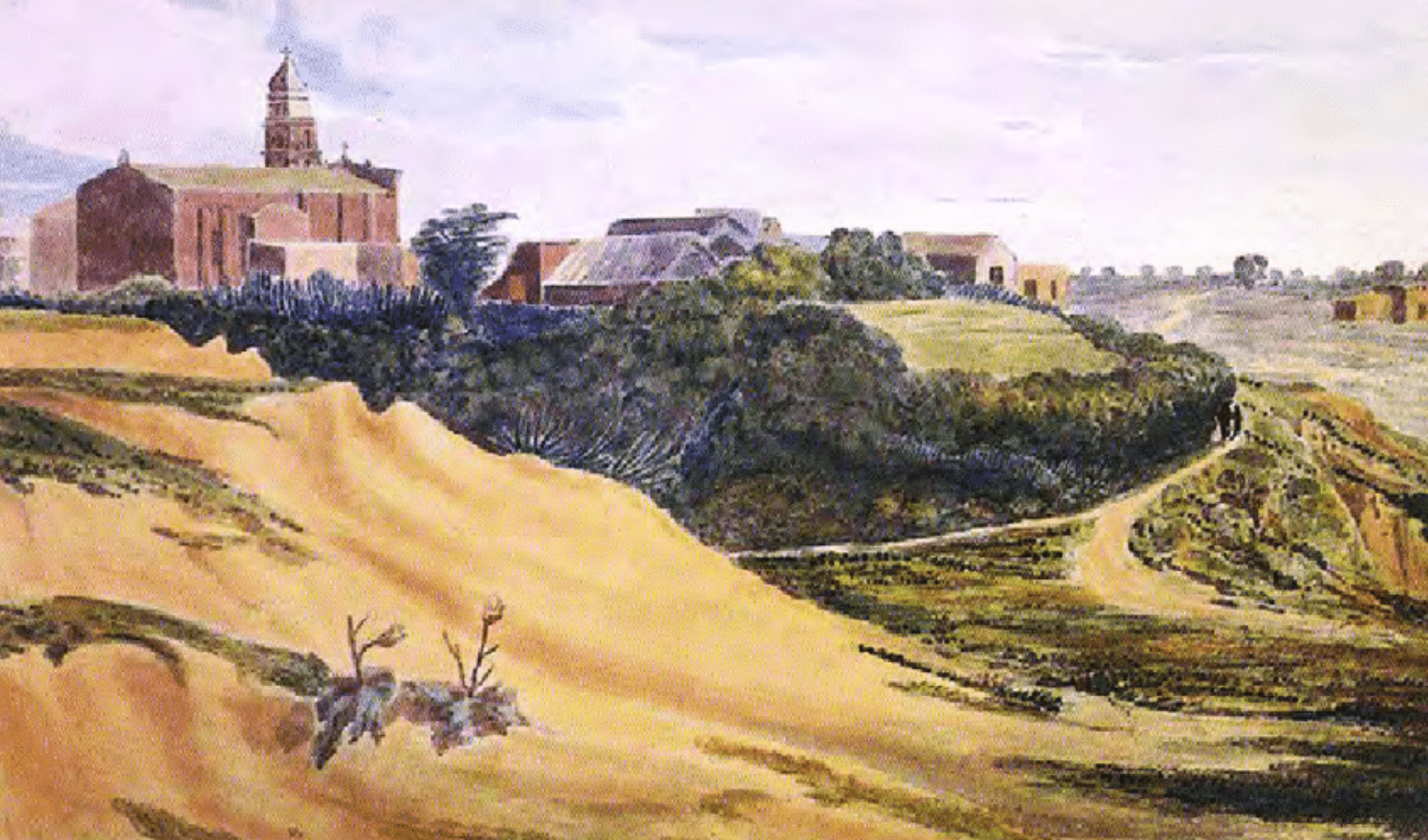
The Church of San Isidro, taken from doña Mariquita Thompson's

The Church of San Isidro, taken from doña Mariquita Thompson's is of interest for several reasons. Unlike the other Argentine watercolours in this section, it was not chosen for publication by Ackermann and hence did not go through the mediation of his engravers and colourists — London artists who had never been to Buenos Aires. It can be discerned whether it less "muddy" than Ackermann's productions. It was drawn from the summer estate of Mariquita Sánchez de Thompson, a prominent Argentine patriot and revolutionary; she kept a literary salon. It shows the town of San Isidro with its early eighteenth century church. "It has great iconographic value, because it makes us know for the first time the aspect of one of those rarely depicted towns of Buenos Aires province, with its miserable dwellings of primitive architecture beside impassable streets", though today the town is prosperous.

=== St Helena. Death of Napoleon. ===
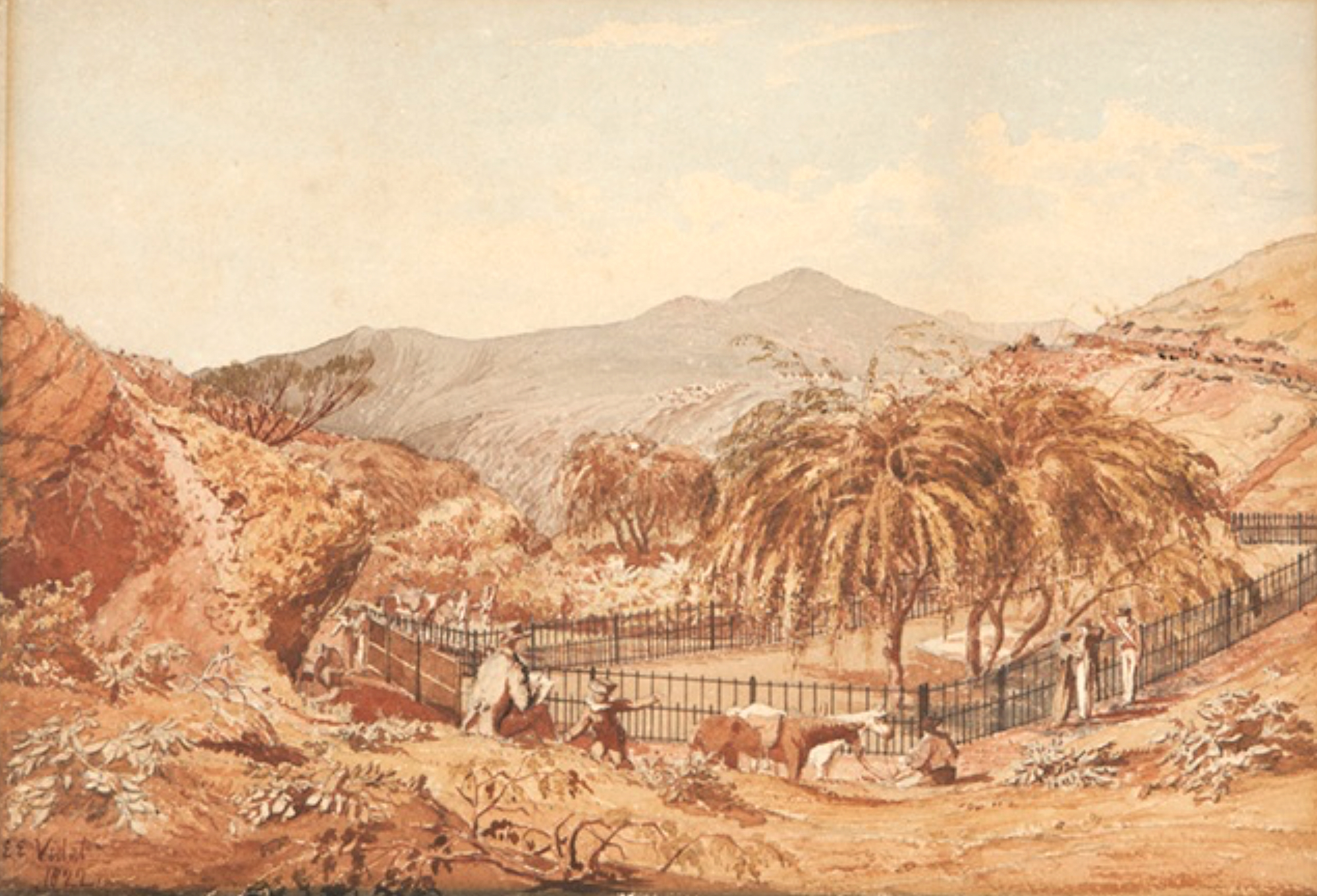
Napoleon's tomb, St Helena, by E.E. Vidal. Contrast the tropical light effect with loamy Buenos Aires. Now, human figures easily go into his landscapes.

In 1815 Napoleon was exiled to the island of St Helena. In 1820 HMS Vigo, flagship of Rear-Admiral Lambert, arrived in St Helena and stayed until September 1821.

The political situation on the island was rife with intrigue. Opposition politicians in England were trying to embarrass the government. It was Lambert's job to make sure Napoleon did not escape by sea. Vidal was Lambert's secretary.

Napoleon had stomach cancer. On 5 May 1821, at about sunset, he died. Next morning, five amateur artists who happened to be present on the island drew him on his deathbed.

In common acceptation, the most talented of the five was Vidal. He wrote: "The head was beautiful, the expression of the face calm and mild, and not the slightest indication of suffering."

It is known that Vidal attended Napoleon's funeral and interment, which he painted. He also painted several views of the island. All these are believed to be in private collections. The one in the illustration is thought to date from 1822.

=== West Indies. Putting down pirates. ===
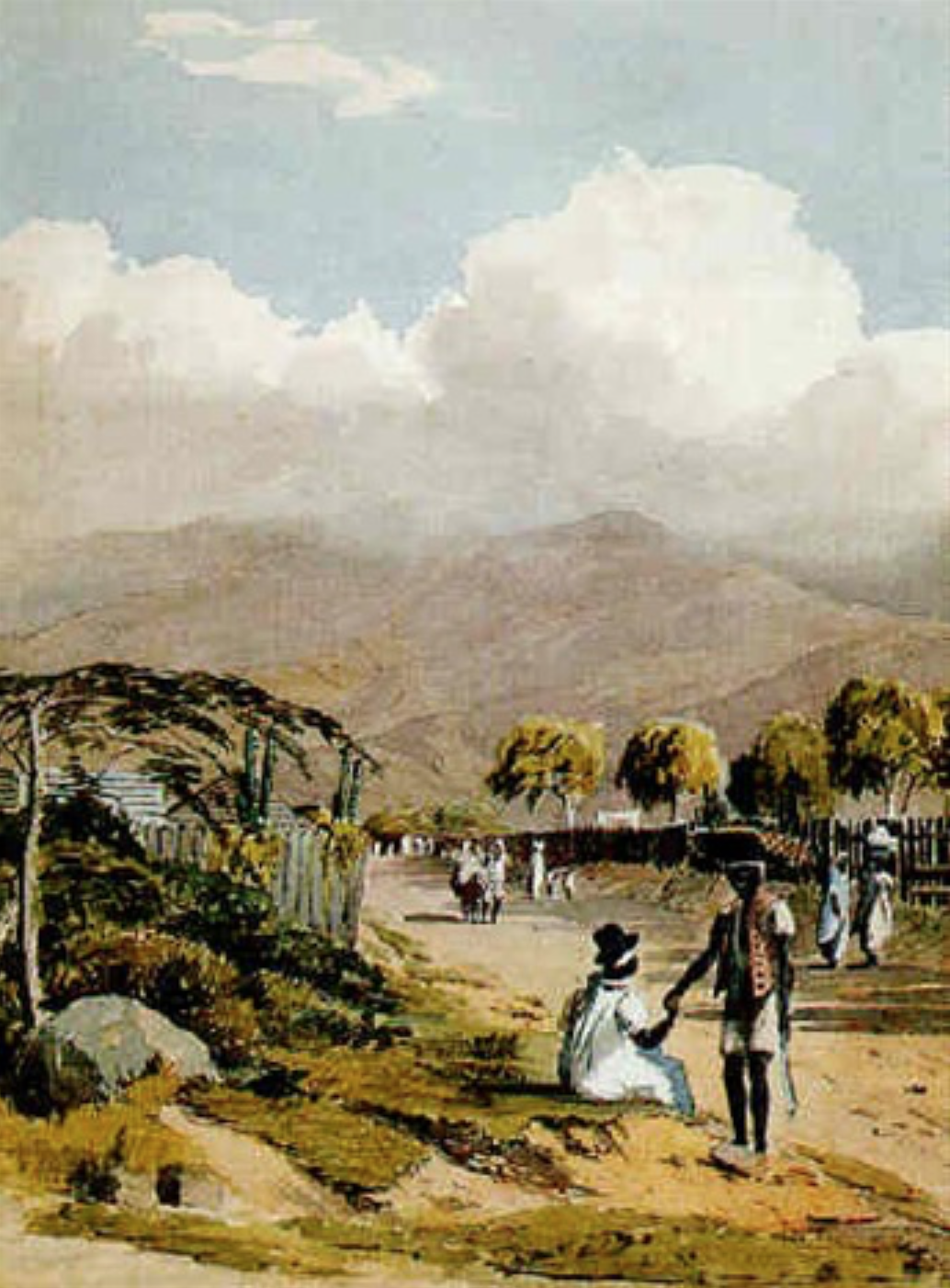
The road from Kingston near Admiral's Pen, Jamaica 1823. Pencil and watercolour, 12 x 9"

In 1823 Vidal transferred to the West India station, serving on board HMS Gloucester as secretary to his old commander Commodore Owen. The squadron was based at Port Royal, Jamaica, formerly Caribbean headquarters of pirates, but now of the Royal Navy, whose job it was to put them down.

Pirates were troublesome, and were vigorously pursued. An American squadron commanded by Commodore David Porter was engaged on similar duty. Less than ten years before, the two countries had been at war, but now the local commanders acting on their own initiative evolved a cooperation. Owen's letters to Porter — drafted by his secretary in ultra-courteous language — exemplify Vidal in his professional role of floating diplomacy secretariat. An extract:

I shall always have great pleasure in cultivating with yourself, and between the officers and others we respectively command, that confidence and amicable feeling, which it is no less my inclination than my duty to preserve, by all means in my power... I beg, also, further to acquaint you that, after a patient investigation in a court of vice admiralty in this island, the captain and nineteen of the crew of the pirate schooner Zaragozana, captured by the boats of his Majesty's ships Tyne and Thracian, after communicating with you in the Bahama channel in the month of March, have been condemned to death...

The letter continued:

This, together with the numerous vessels which have been destroyed of late, I hope will give a check to the nefarious practices of these remorseless depredators, and relieve the peaceful trader from all fear of future outrage. - And, in the hope of seeing this great end accomplished by the exertions of the several individuals we respectively command, in which we may preserve a commendable rivalry, I have the honor to subscribe myself, sir, your very obedient and humble servant, E.W.C.R. Owen.

==== Two Jamaican prints ====
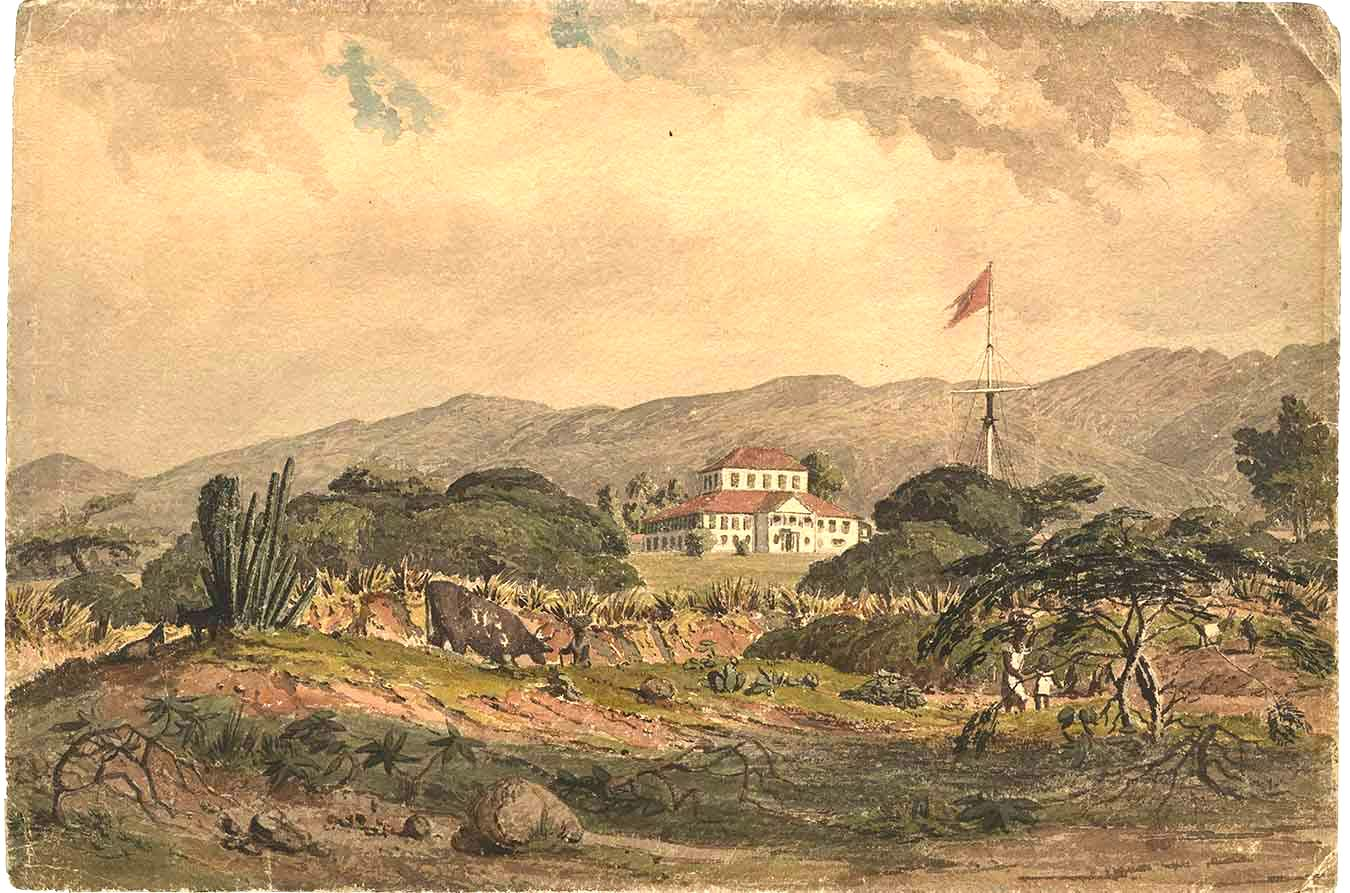
Admiral's Pen, flying the broad pennant of Commodore Owen

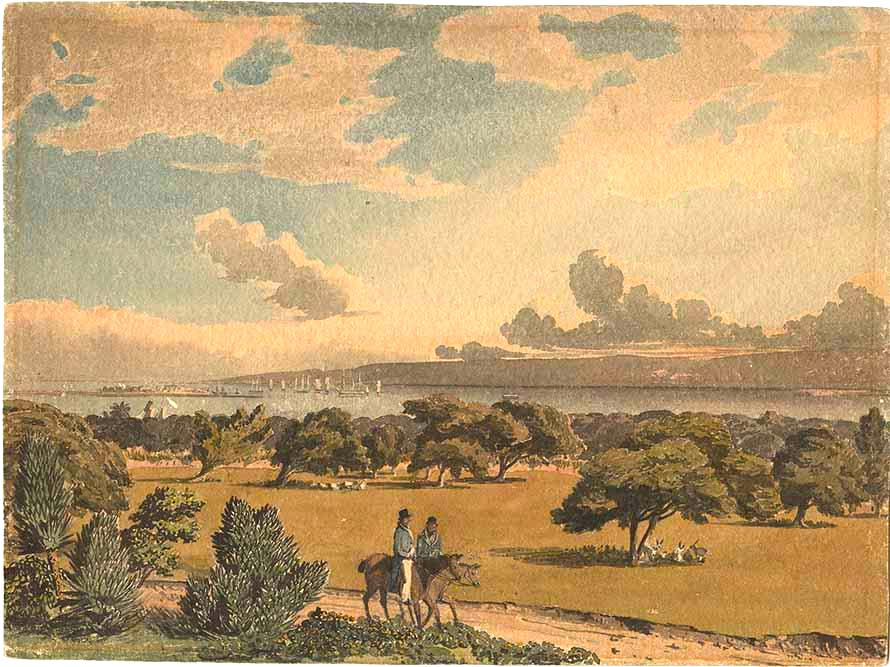
View from Admiral's Pen, with shipping in distance

=== Second South American tour ===
==== Ship-painting in tropical waters ====
From December 1822 to July 1829 Vidal was back in the South America squadron. In Brazil he turned the tropical light to advantage in some ship paintings e.g. HMS Ganges at Anchor and Drying Her Sails off Rio de Janeiro.

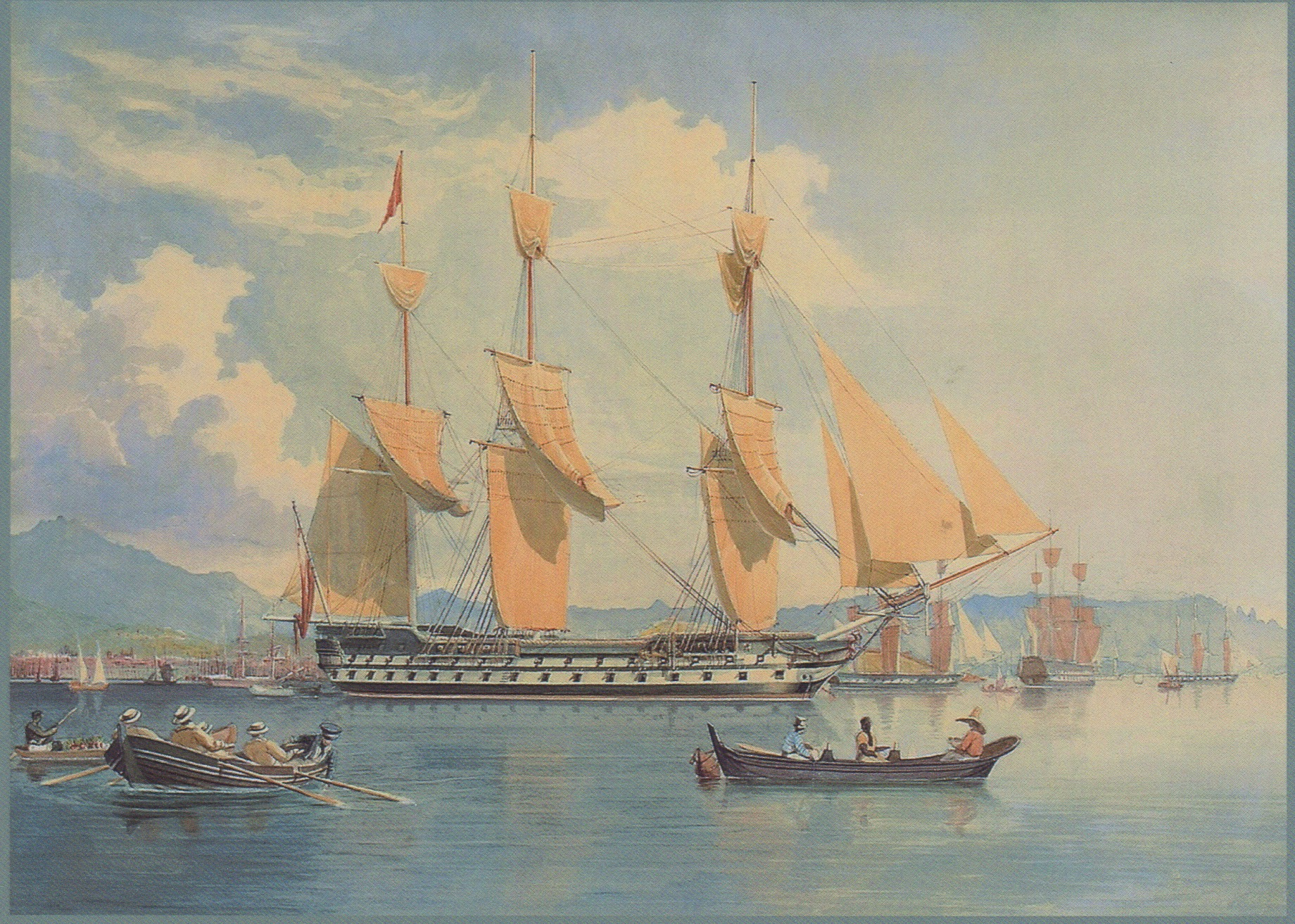
HMS Ganges at Anchor and Drying her Sails off Rio Janeiro

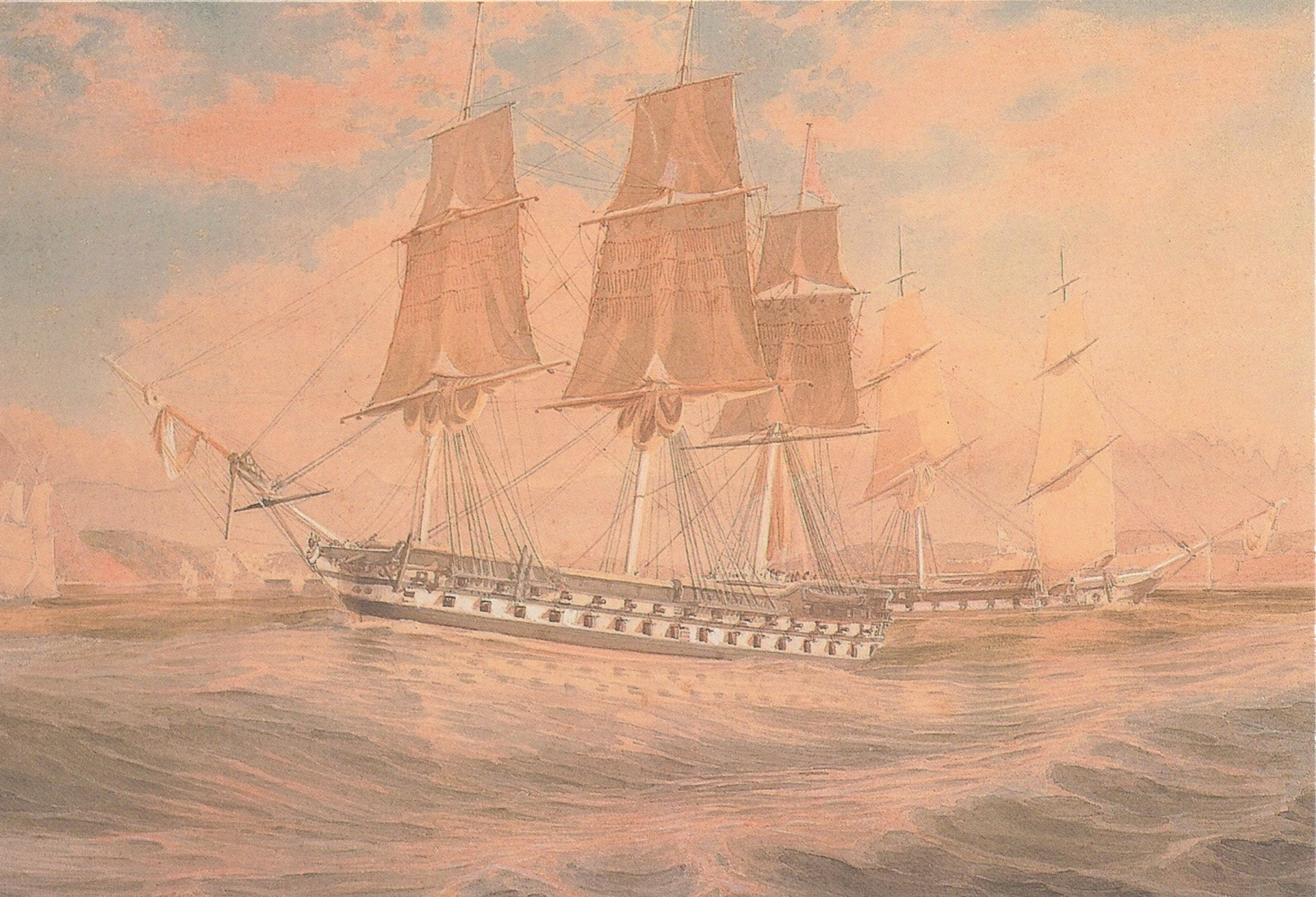
HMSs Ganges and Thetis off Rio de Janeiro

Brazil was at war with Argentina and the Royal Navy often had to cruise to Buenos Aires and Montevideo to protect British shipping. Most of his surviving works of that period were created in Brazil.

Exceptions are The Mole at Monte Video — Sunrise (1828) and his colossal Mode of Lazoing Cattle in Buenos Ayres (1829)

==== "Mode of Lazoing Cattle in Buenos Ayres" ====
Vidal dedicated this huge (122 x 185 inches) watercolour to Lady Ponsonby, wife of the British ambassador to Buenos Aires.

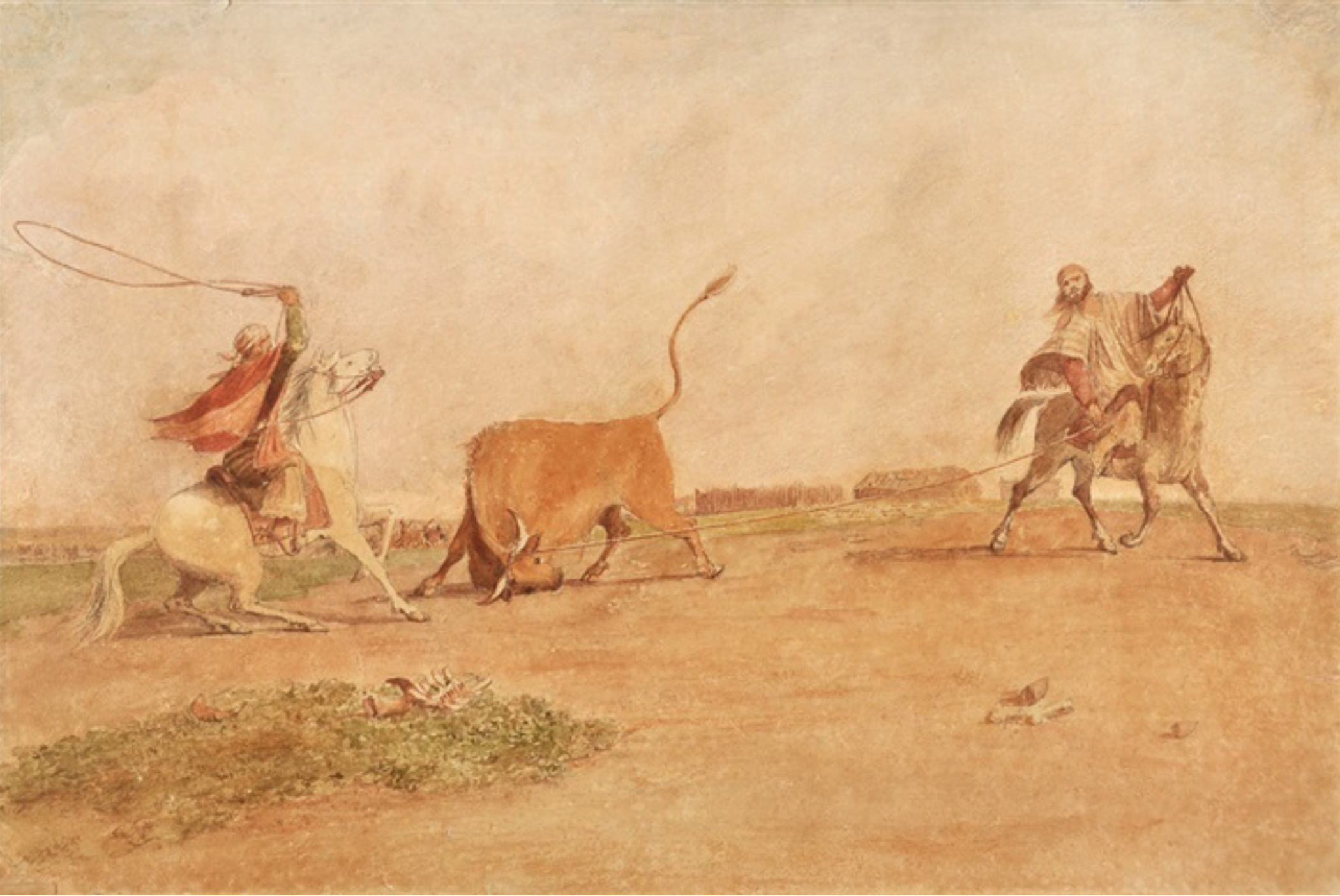
Mode of Lazoing Cattle in Buenos Ayres, Drawn for the Lady P.[onsonby], 1829. Gauchos could lasso any part of an animal and their aim was unerring. Once lassoed in two places their horses knew to run in opposite directions to jerk the ropes tight. One man would dismount — his horse spontaneously keeping the rope tight — and despatch the victim with his facón. Even a jaguar could be killed by this method.

==== Gallery: Vidal's Brazilian watercolours 1827-30 ====
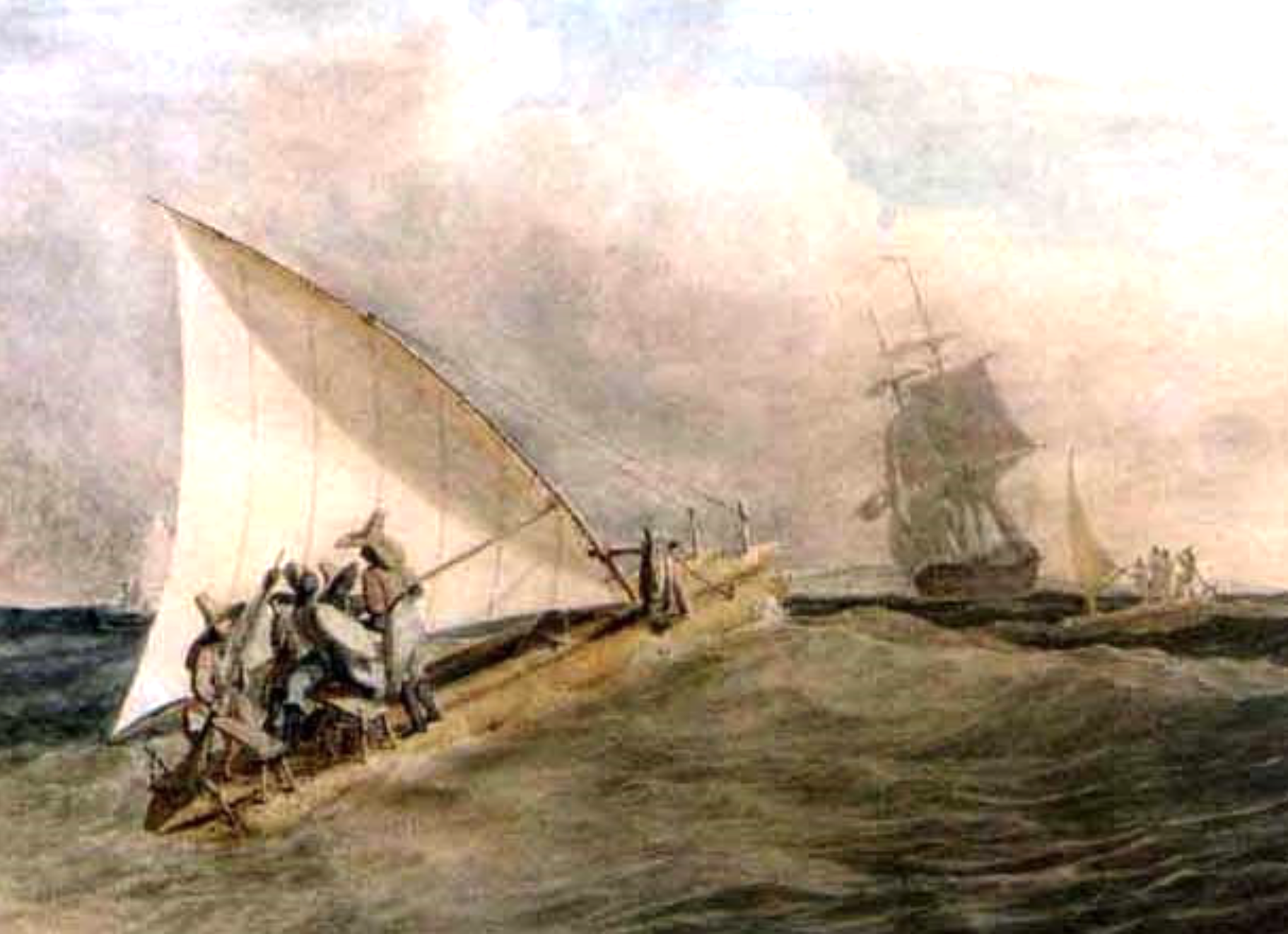
1. Fishing raft, 1830

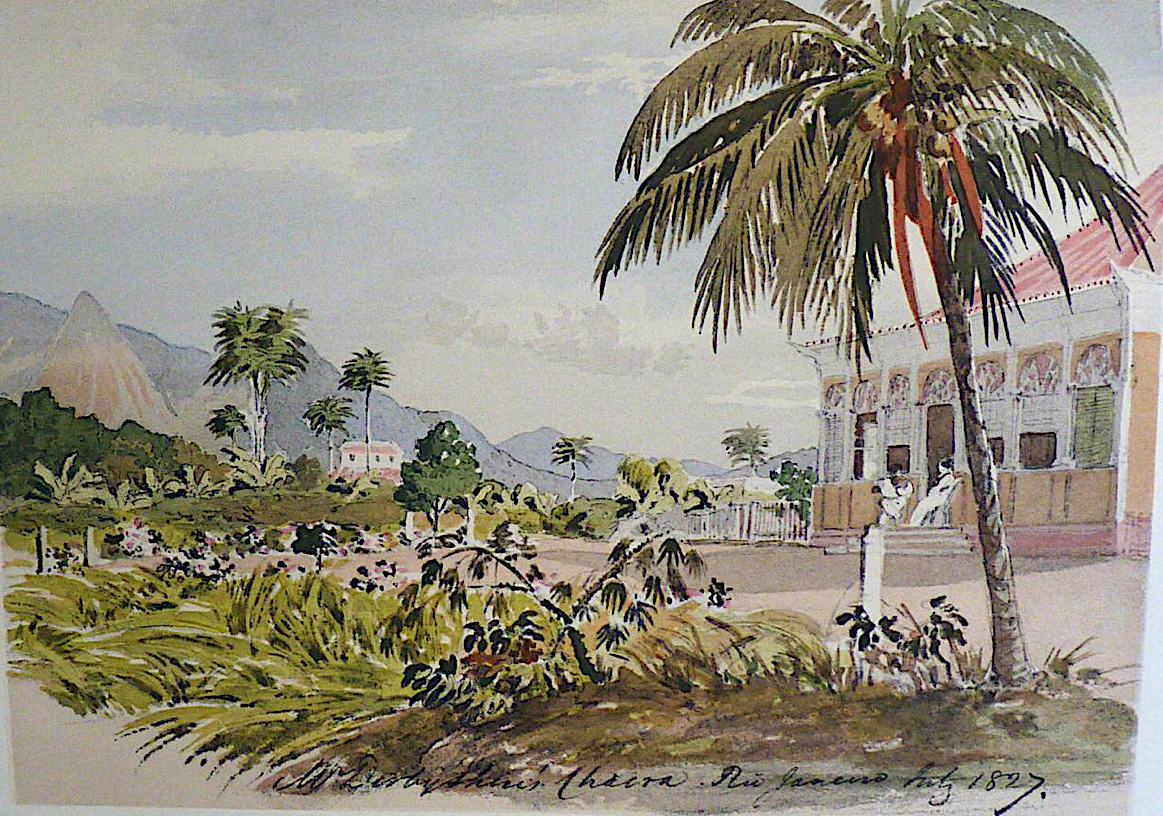
2. Mr Derbyshire's Chacra, 1827

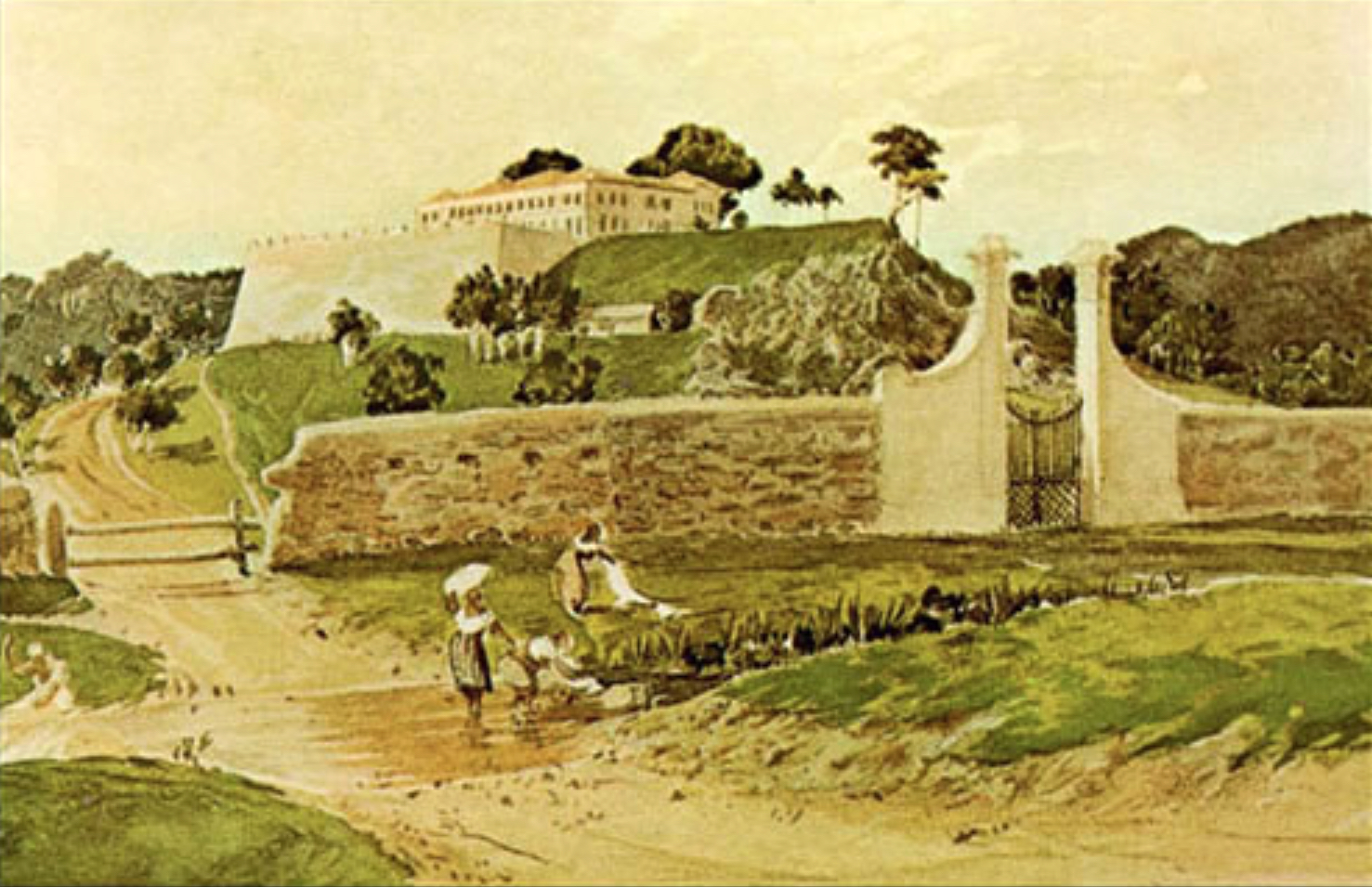
3. Mr Fox's House, 1829

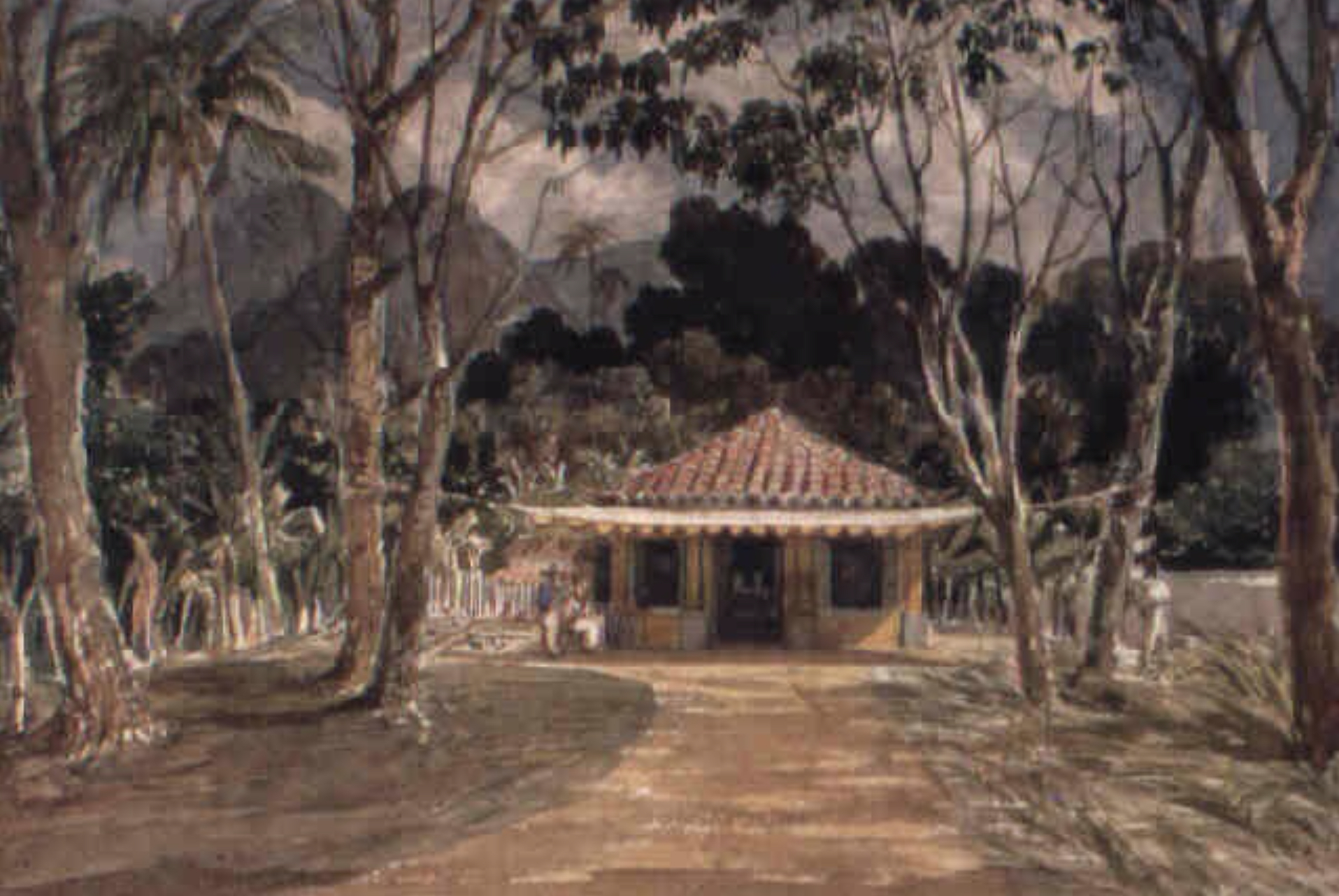
4. Caminho Velho 1830

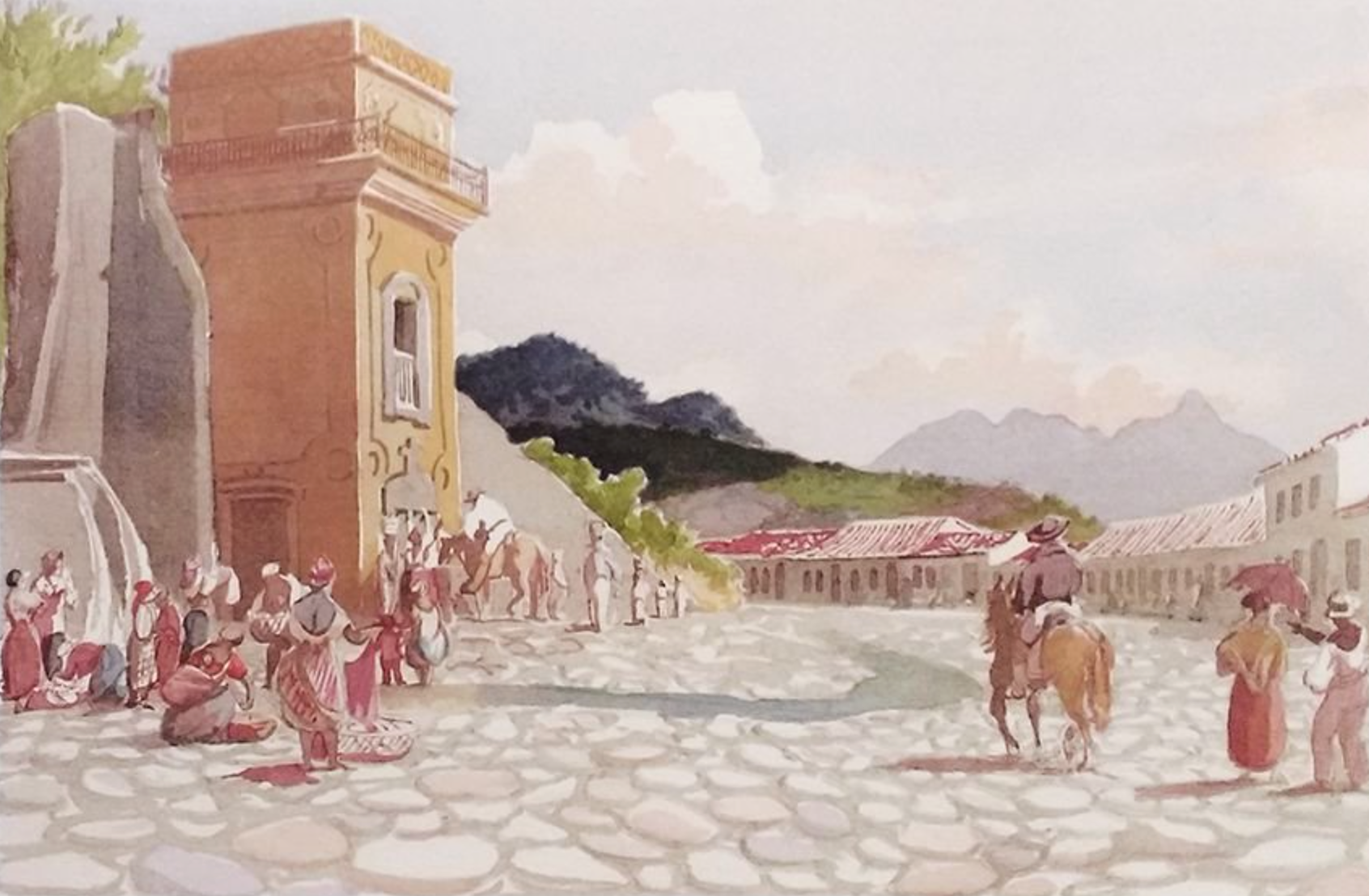
5. Public Fountain, 1827
1. Brazilian Jungada (fishing craft) in Pernambuco Roads, with that harbour in the distance and the deserted City of Olinda. A jangada is a type of exposed, deep water fishing raft still used in northern Brazil. The crew kept half the catch, the owner got the other. Vidal's watercolour conveys a sense of how dangerous a calling it was. That Olinda — now a UNESCO World Heritage site — was deserted is a little known historical detail.
2. Mr Derbyshire's Chacra, Rio de Janeiro, 1827. Derbyshire was a British merchant. A chácara is a small estate or farm.
3. Mr Fox was another English resident.
4. Caminho Velho (The Old Road), 1830
5. Public Fountain (O Chafariz de Catumbi), Rio de Janeiro, 1827

=== Portugal ===
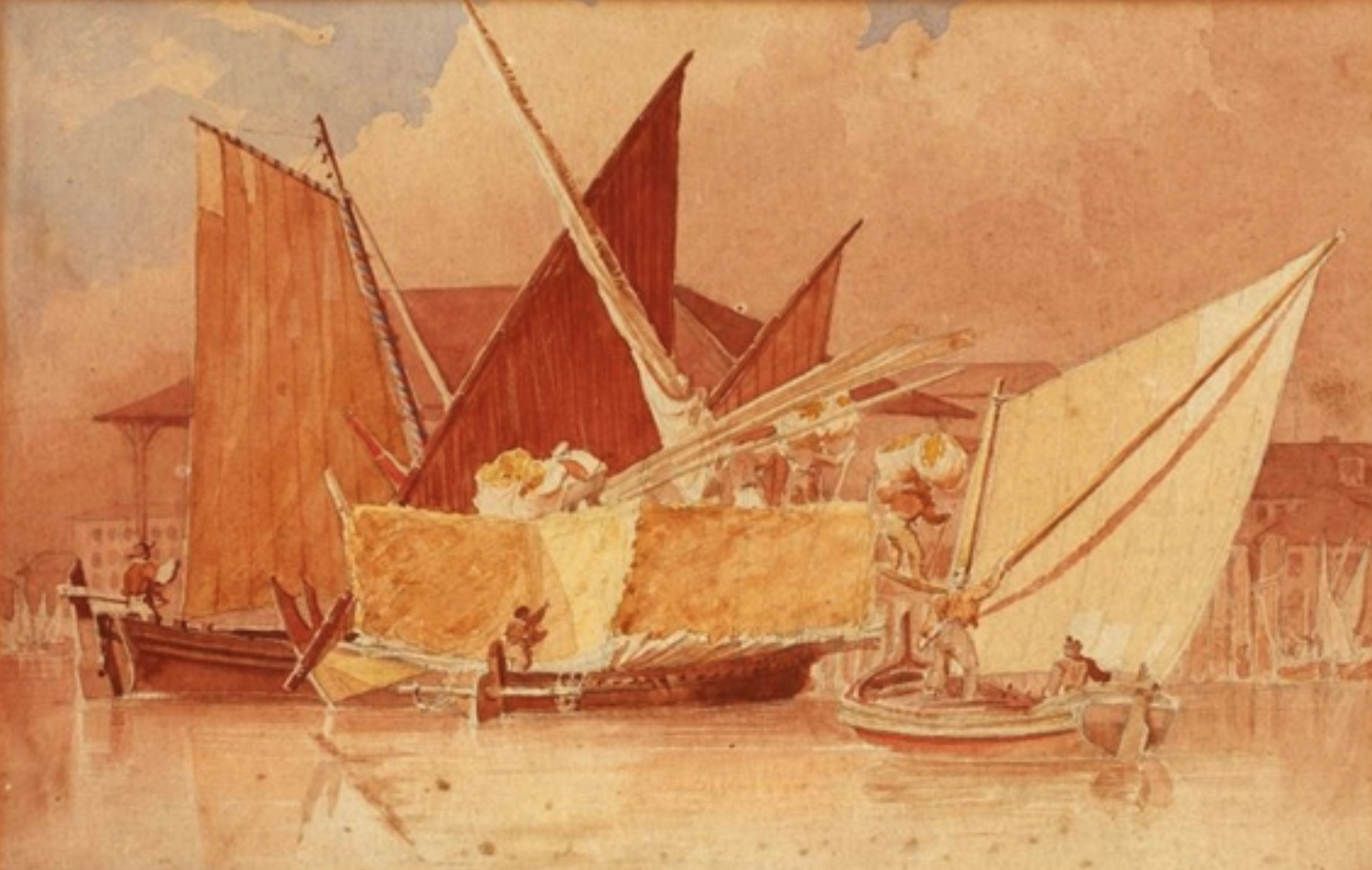
Ribeira Velho

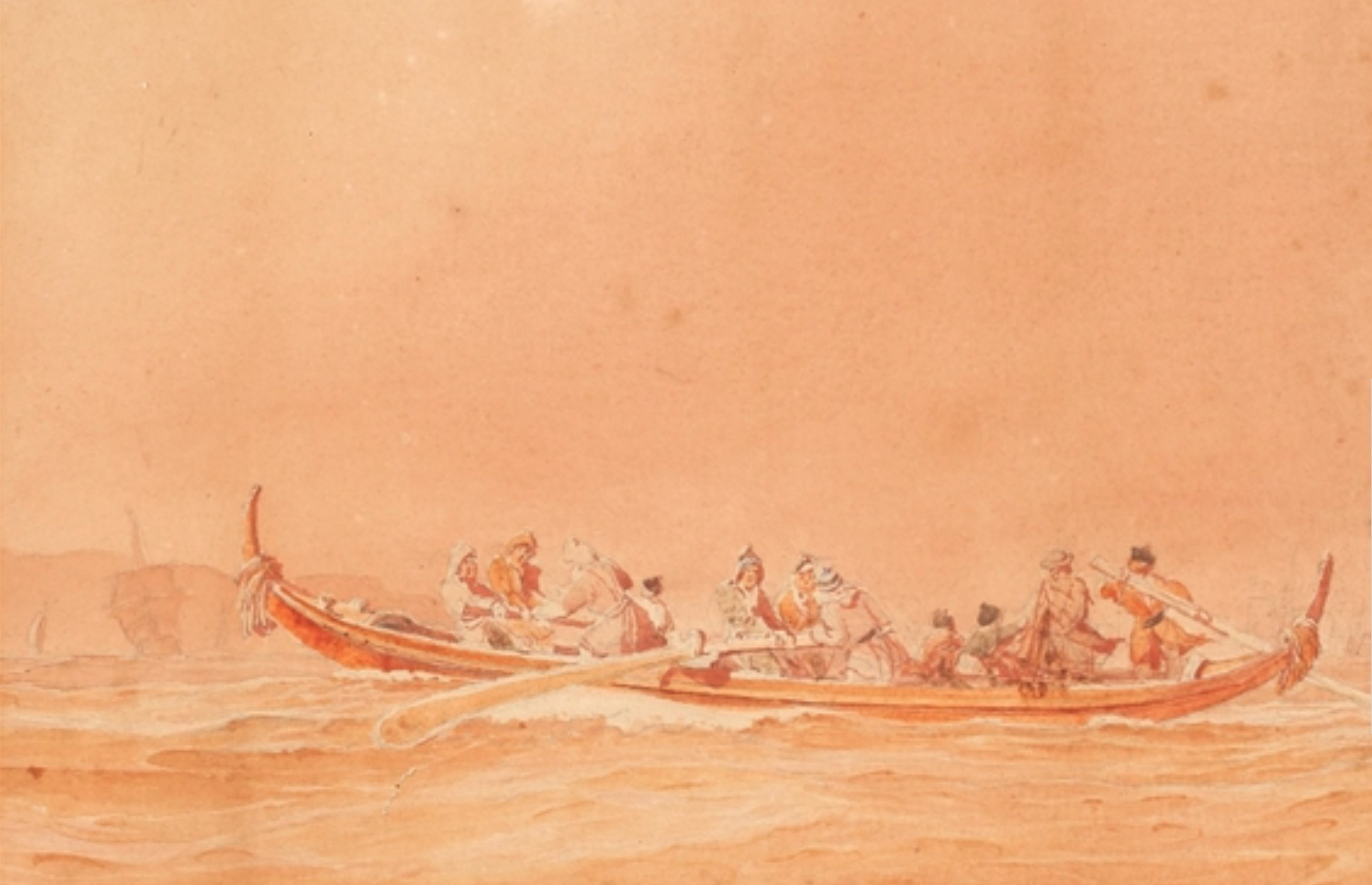
Tagus fishing boat, bad weather

Whether his Portuguese watercolours were affected by his near-fatal wound has not yet been discussed in the literature.

=== Last South American tour ===
==== Trying to suppress the slave trade ====
In his last tour of duty Vidal was secretary to Sir Graham Hamond who, from his station headquarters at Rio de Janeiro was supposed to suppress the slave trade — both on the Atlantic and Pacific shores of South America — when he had only "one Third Rate, one Fifth Rate, five sloops, two brigantines and a gun-brig".

The situation demanded the utmost diplomatic tact. Though slavery was legal and widespread in Brazil, there was an abolitionist faction in politics, and the Empire of Brazil had signed a convention to ban the transatlantic trade. Slave ships captured by the Royal Navy were brought to Rio de Janeiro and tried before Brazilian-British mixed courts. The slaves, already sickly, could not be liberated from the hot, overcrowded, unsanitary vessel until she was condemned; but, since adjudication took time, quite a few died — or, on one occasion, were abducted by an armed gang. Means had to be provided for looking after these unfortunates (wrote Commodore Hamond to London in a letter drafted by Vidal), else

the stopping of a slave-vessel is only exposing the blacks to greater misery, and a much greater chance of speedy death, than if they were left to their original destination of slavery, to say nothing of the horrors which the officers and men in charge of the vessel undergo, of which it is not easy to form an adequate idea without having witnessed them.

==== Gallery: Vidal's last Brazilian paintings ====
On this station Vidal once again developed a characteristic style of painting. In these years, far from home, not seeing his wife and children for years at a time, often racked with pain, he must have perceived the locale in a new way.

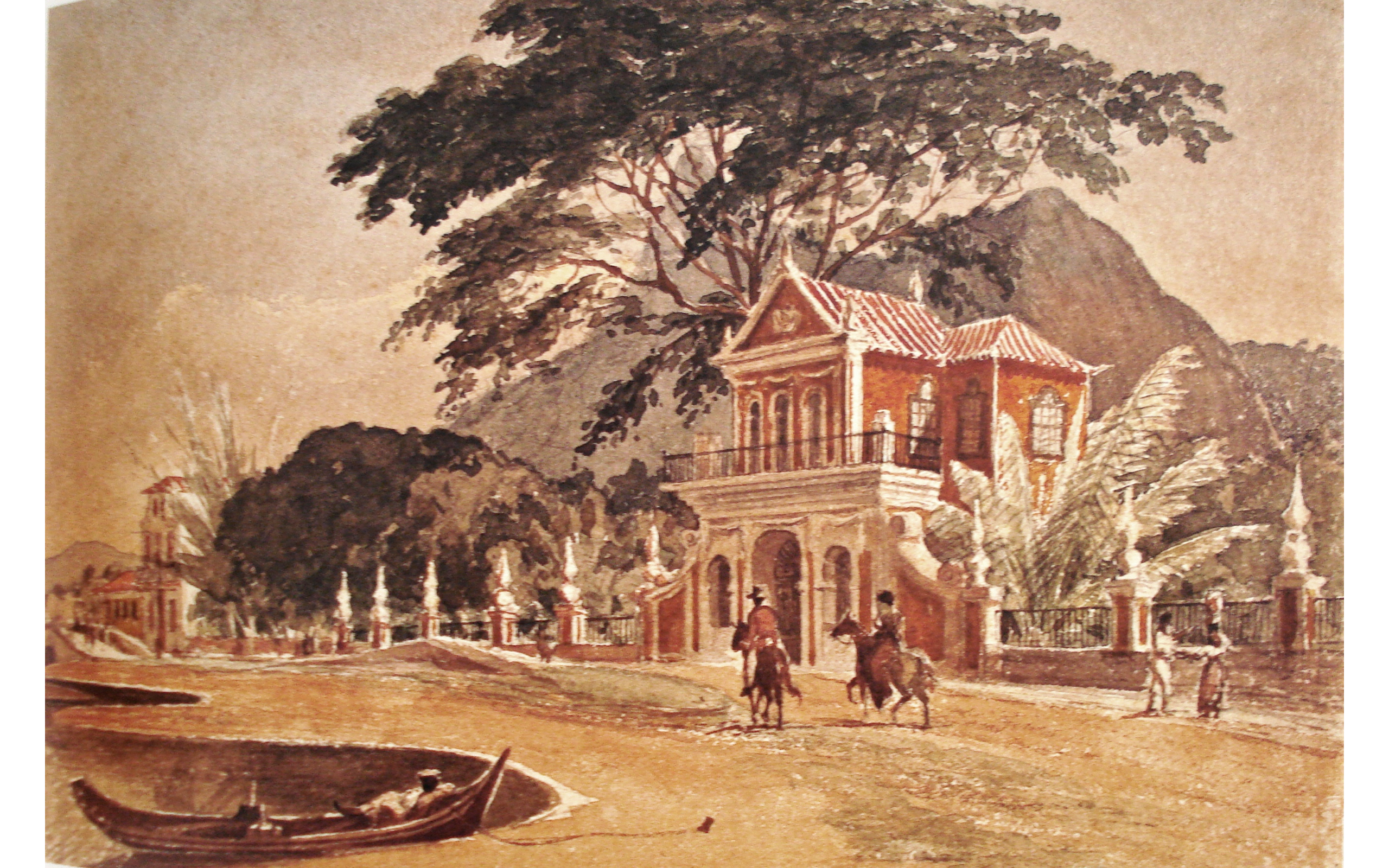
1. Botafogo

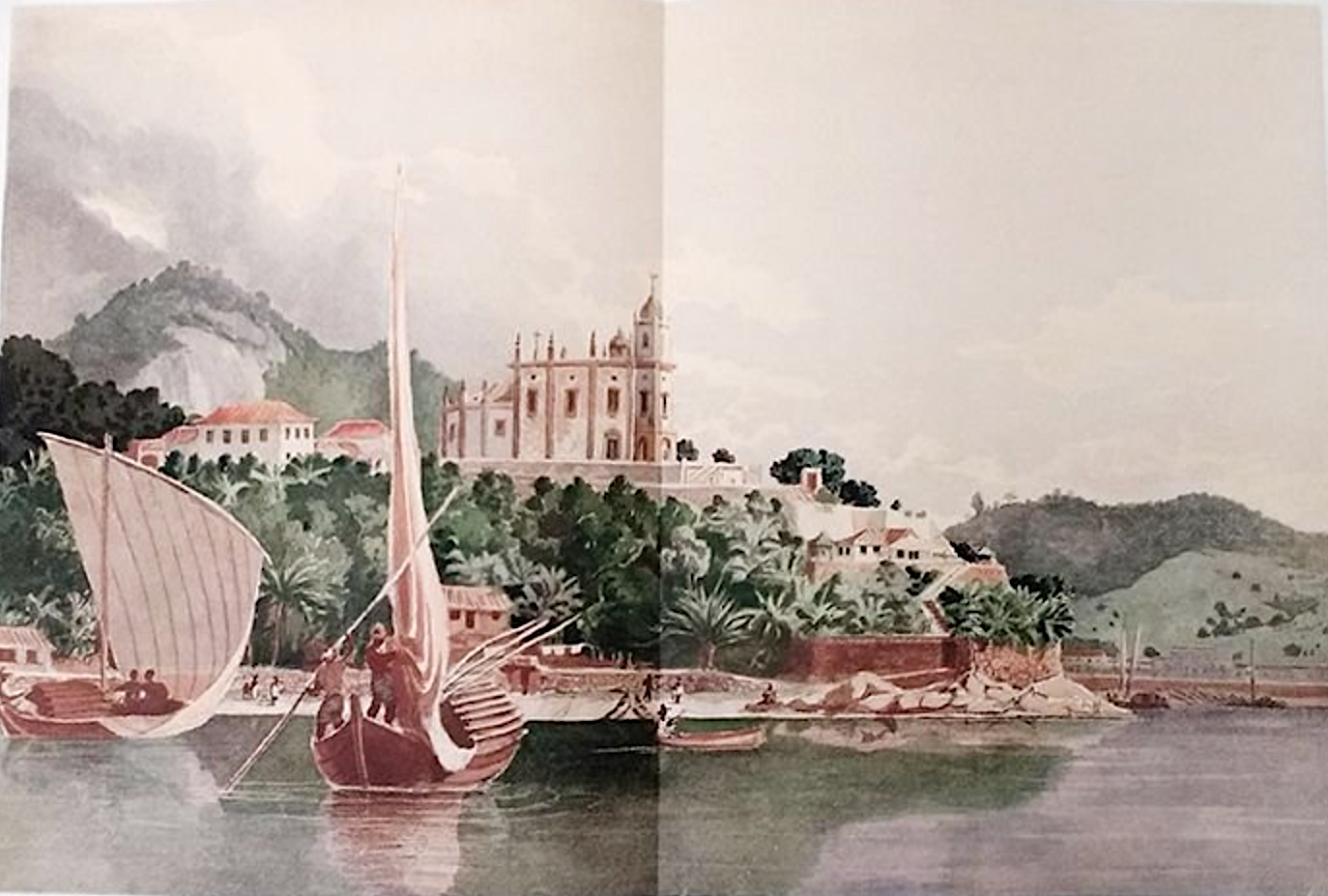
2. Gloria Church

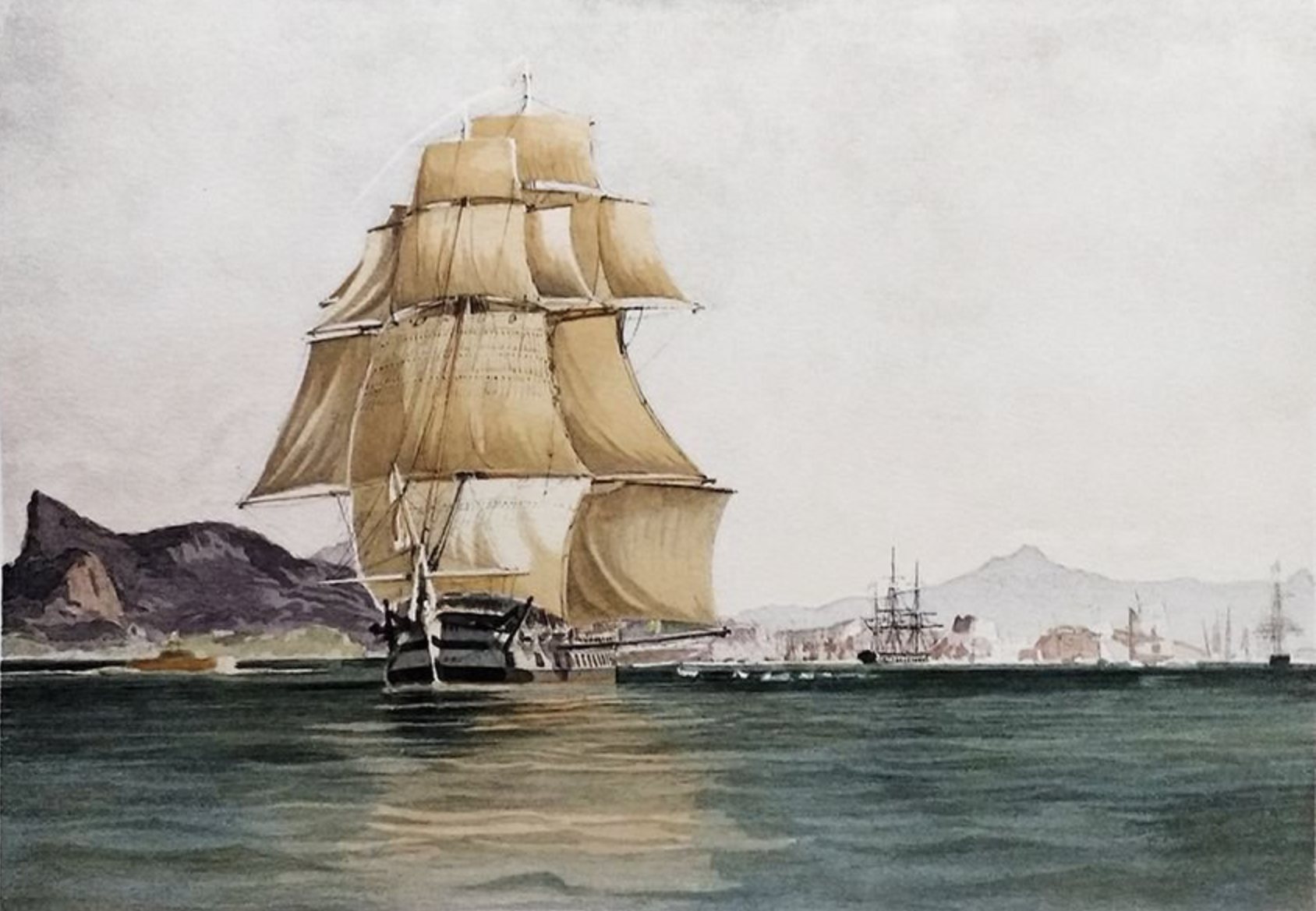
3. HMS Spartiate

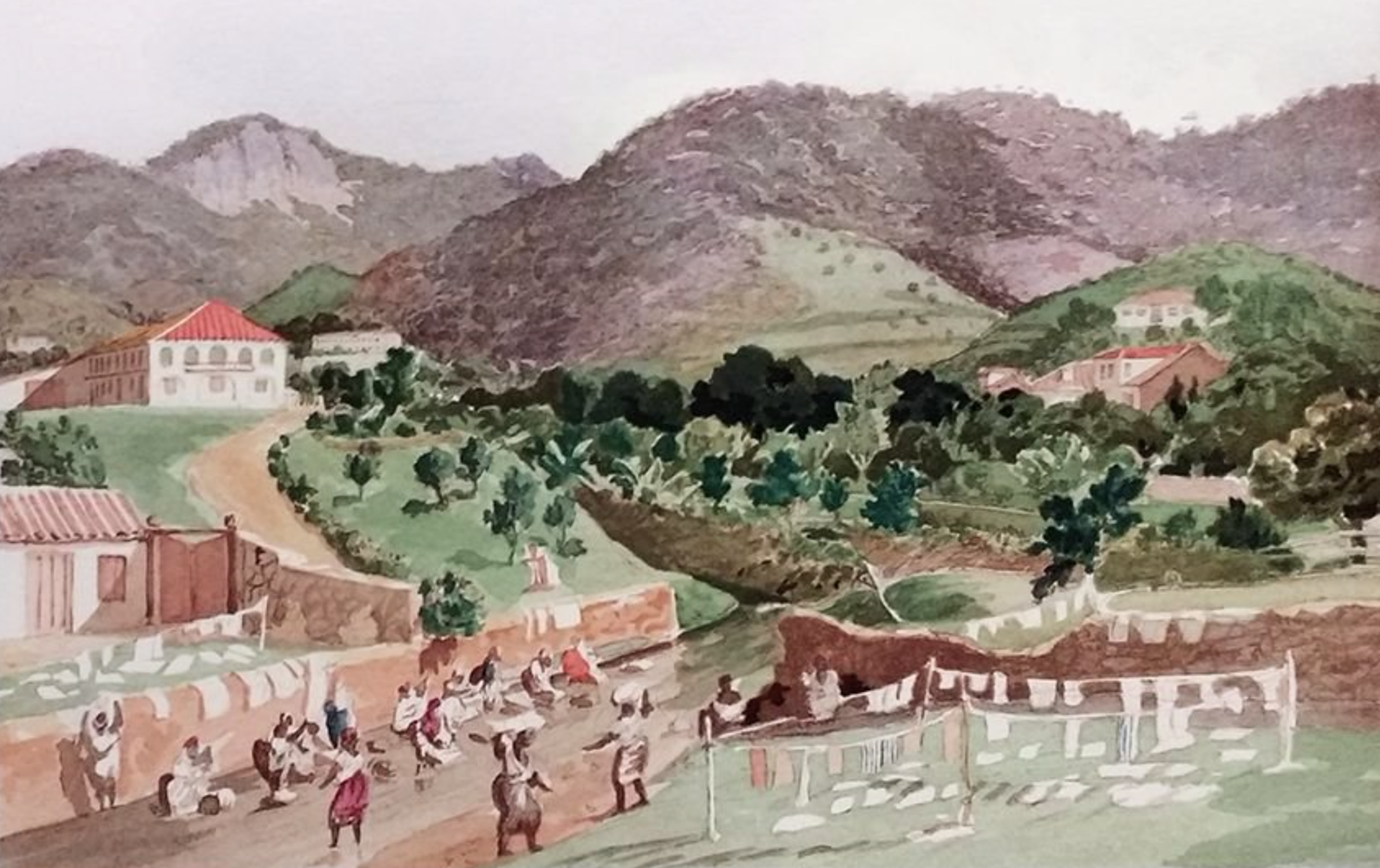
4. Laranjeiras
1. Enseada de Botafogo (Botafogo Bay), 1835.
2. Rio de Janeiro - Gloria Church, 1835.
3. HMS Spartiate leaving Rio de Janeiro, 1835.
4. The Valley of Larangeras [sic] from the Bridge of Catete, 1835.

==== A social document: a ball on board a man o' war ====
A very different watercolour (1835) serves to document an aspect of life on the South America station. The high-status individuals attending this Rio de Janeiro ball include the Governor General of India and the best-selling novelist Emily Eden.

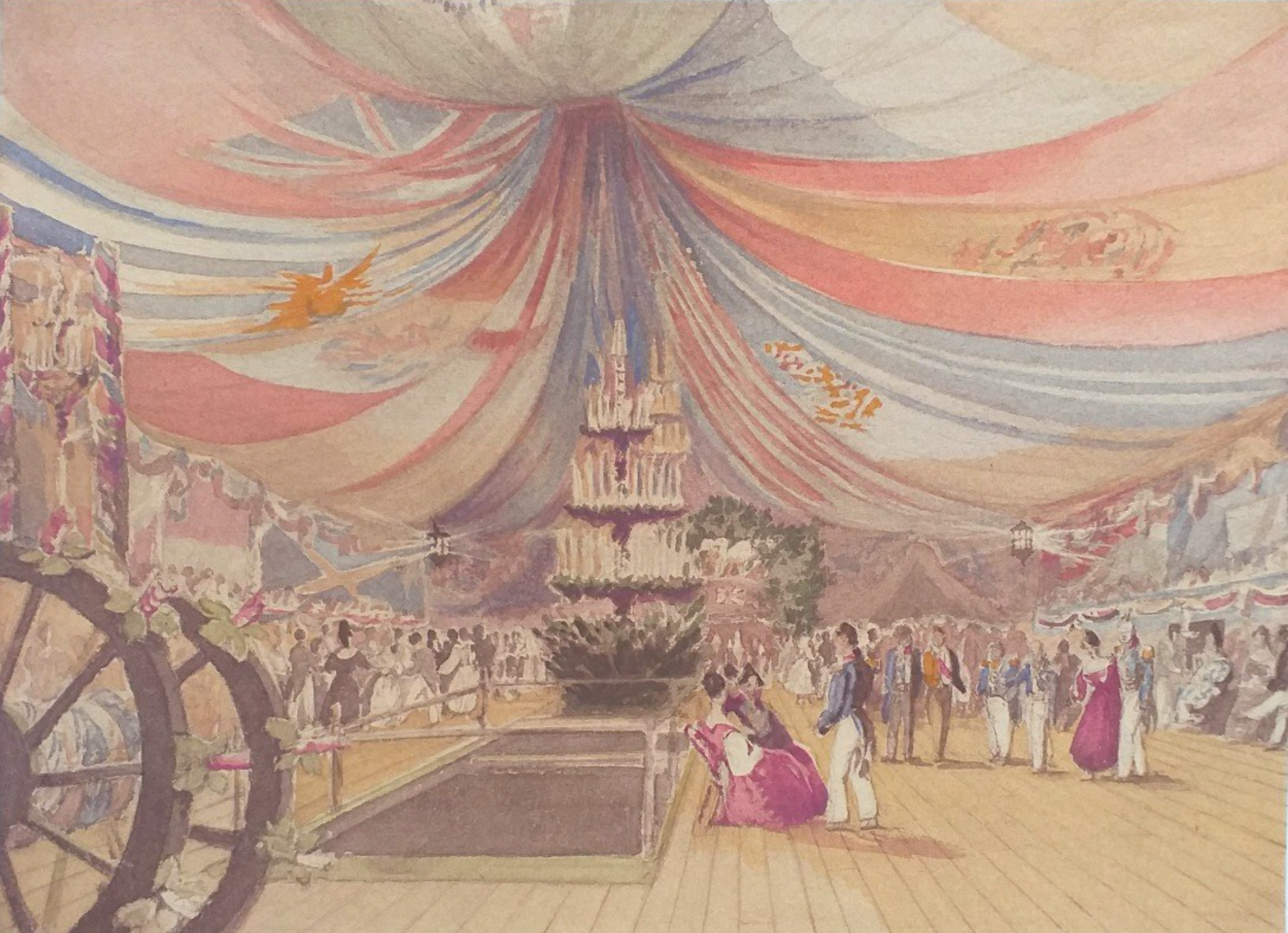
Sketch of the ball given by Admiral Sir G.E. Hamond to Lord Auckland on board HMS Dublin in Rio de Janeiro - E.E. Vidal - 30 November 1835 (Note: The date of the watercolour. The ball itself took place on Saturday 20 November (Hamond 1984, p. 108).) A rare image of a formal ball aboard a man o' war. Lord Auckland was on his way out to India to serve as Governor General. (The winds were such that Brazil was usually the quickest way to India; the Portuguese had discovered Brazil in 1500 for that very reason.) From the canopy of flags it may be inferred that the diplomatic corps was invited. Flag officers on foreign stations were, in effect, floating diplomats, and cultivated links accordingly.

== Publication ==
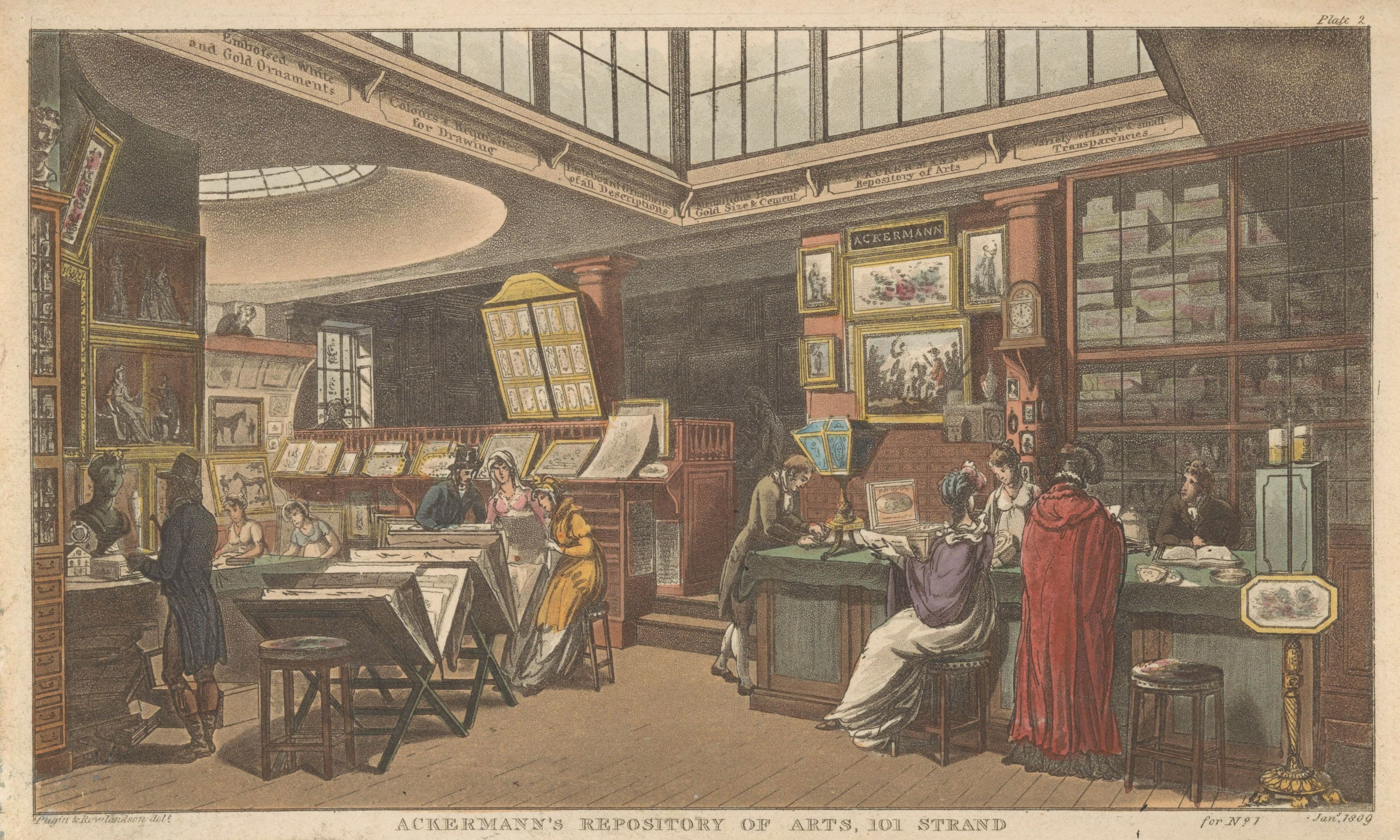
Ackermann's Repository of Arts, 101 Strand, London, by Augustus Pugin and Thomas Rowlandson

In 1820 the London Anglo-German publisher Rudolph Ackermann brought out Picturesque Illustrations of Buenos Ayres and Monte Video: Consisting of Twenty-Four Views Accompanied with Descriptions of the Scenery, and of the Costumes, Manners, &c of the Inhabitants of those Cities and their Environs by E.E. Vidal. It is a colour plate book: the watercolours were reproduced by the aquatint process and each print was hand-coloured. Vidal himself wrote 140 pages of accompanying text. However, Ackermann took certain liberties: his engravers altered some details and many pages of the text were altered. It has been described as "The most famous of the costumbrista travel books of the Rio de la Plata region". Maggs Bros said it was "The best authority for the Life and Customs of the River Plate countries at the beginning of the nineteenth century". Bonifacio del Carril went so far as to say "It was, without doubt, the most important book published on Argentina in the nineteenth century".

For a long time his Brazilian watercolours were thought to be lost but a number were found to be in the possession of Vidal's descendants and acquired by an Argentine collector. Picturesque Illustrations of Rio de Janeiro was published by Librería l'Amateur, Buenos Aires in 1961, with an introduction by two members of the Brazilian Historic and Geographic Institute, the watercolours being reproduced by the au pochoir handcraft process. In 2019 a mint condition copy was being offered for sale for $1,000.

== Originals ==
The watercolours used by Ackermann were acquired by the Argentine scientist and polymath Francisco P. Moreno. The Argentine collector Alejo González Garaño bought these from Moreno's heirs and made it his purpose to acquire the others. Towards the end of his life he wrote: "Seventy are the original watercolours of Vidal, that form the most precious part of my collection of graphic records pertaining to our country; I have the satisfaction of having reunited and saved these from an inevitable dispersion and destruction." However he died and his collection was dispersed in 1949.

It was Vidal's practice to sign and date his watercolours and from those that are known it can be inferred that he was fairly productive and that he gave many away. How many have survived, but are undiscovered, is unknown.

== Bibliography ==
=== General works ===
- Andrews, George Reid (1979). "Race versus Class Association: The Afro-Argentines of Buenos Aires, 1850–1900". Journal of Latin American Studies. 11 (1). Cambridge University Press: 19–39. doi:10.1017/S0022216X00022288. JSTOR 156406.
- Belluzzo, Ana Maria (2008). "O viajante e a paisagem brasileira". REVISTA PORTO ARTE: Revista de Artes Visuais (in Portuguese). V (25). Porto Alegre.
- Bethell, Leslie (1966). "The Mixed Commissions for the Suppression of the Transatlantic Slave Trade in the Nineteenth Century". The Journal of African History. 7 (1). Cambridge University Press: 79–93. doi:10.1017/S0021853700006095. JSTOR 179461.
- Chaplin, Arnold (1919). A St Helena's Who's Who, or a Directory of the Island During the Captivity of Napoleon. London: Arthur L. Humphries.
- Chisholm, Hugh, ed. (1910). "Foundling Hospitals" . Encyclopædia Britannica. Vol. 10 (11th ed.). Cambridge University Press. pp. 746–747.
- Crawford, Michael J., ed. (2002). The Naval War of 1812: a Documentary History. Vol. III. Washington DC: Naval Historical Center, Department Of The Navy. ISBN 0160512247.
- Cunha, Lygia da Fonseca Fernandes da (2010). "Vinte Álbuns de Estampas do Rio de Janeiro". O Acervo Iconográfico da Biblioteca Nacional (PDF) (in Portuguese). Rio de Janeiro: Fundacion Biblioteca Nacional. ISBN 9788533306066. Archived from the original (PDF) on 10 November 2018.
- Deas, Malcolm D.; Brown, Joseph; Sanchez, Efraín; Martínez, Aída (1989). Tipos Y Costumbres de la Nueva Granada: La Colección de Pinturas Formada en Colombia Por Joseph Brown Entre 1825 Y 1841 Y El Diario de Su Excursión a Girón, 1834. Fondo Cultural Cafetero. ISBN 958914425X.
- del Carril, Bonifacio (1980). Corridas de Toros en Buenos Aires (in Spanish). Buenos Aires: Emecé Editores. ISBN 950-04-0762-0.
- Distefano, Lynne D. (2001). "The Ontario Cottage: The Globalization of a British Form in the Nineteenth Century". Traditional Dwellings and Settlements Review. 12 (2). International Association for the Study of Traditional Environments (IASTE): 33–43. JSTOR 41757868.
- Driver, Felix (2004). "Distance and Disturbance: Travel, Exploration and Knowledge in the Nineteenth Century". Transactions of the Royal Historical Society. Sixth. XIV. Cambridge University Press: 73–93. ISBN 0-521-84995-0.
- Glascock, William Nugent (1834). Naval Sketch Book. 2. Vol. II. London: Whittaker.
- González Garaño, Alejo B. (1933). Acuarelas de E. E. Vidal: Buenos Aires en 1816, 1817, 1818 y 1819 (in Spanish). Buenos Aires: Exposición Amigos del Arte.
- González Garaño, Alejo B. (1943). Iconografía Argentina Anterior a 1820. Con una noticia de la vida y obra de E.E. Vidal (in Spanish) (2 ed.). Buenos Aires: Emecé Editores.
- "Grievances of Naval Officers". Hampshire Advertiser. 15 December 1838.
- Grindal, Peter (2016). Opposing the Slavers: The Royal Navy's Campaign Against the Slave Trade. London and New York: Tauris. ISBN 978-178453-387-8.
- Hamond, Sir Graham E. (1836). "Third Enclosure in No. 72". Correspondence with Foreign Power relating to the Slave Trade. London: HMSO.
- Hamond, Sir Graham Eden (1984). Os Diários do Almirante Graham Eden Hamond 1825–1834/38 (in Portuguese). Translated by Geyer, Paulo F. Rio de Janeiro: Editora JB.
- Hanciles, Jehu (2002). Euthanasia of a Mission: African Church Autonomy in a Colonial Context. Westport: Praeger. ISBN 0-275-97570-3.
- Holmden, H. R. (1912). Catalogue of Maps, Plans and Charts in the Map Room of the Dominion Archives. Ottawa: Government Printing Bureau.
- House of Lords (1840). "Minutes of Evidence taken before the Commissioners for inquiring into Naval and Military Promotion and Retirement". Sessional Papers. Vol. XL. House of Lords.
- "Indian Omnium". The Atlas. 4 October 1835.
- Lachenicht, Susanne (2007). "Huguenot Immigrants and the Formation of National Identities, 1548-1787". The Historical Journal. 50 (2). Cambridge University Press: 309–331. doi:10.1017/S0018246X07006085. JSTOR 4140132.
- Lareau, François (2019). "Index of Canadian Artists (Visual Arts) ---V; Répertoire des artistes canadiens (Arts visuels)---V".
- "Letters from Buenos Ayres". Bath Chronicle and Weekly Gazette. 17 October 1816.
- Maggs Bros (1922). Bibliotheca Americana, Part IX. London: Maggs Bros.
- Magnasco. "PICTURESQUE ILLUSTRATIONS OF RIO DE JANEIRO". AbeBooks.com.
- Marshall, John (1835). Royal Naval Biography. Vol. IV.—Part II. London: Longman, Rees, Orme, Brown, Oreen, and Longman.
- Martins, Luciana de Lima (1998). "Navigating in Tropical Waters: British Maritime Views of Rio de Janeiro". Imago Mundi. 50: 141–155. doi:10.1080/03085699808592884. JSTOR 1151396.
- "Marriages". London Evening Standard. 6 April 1848.
- McKendry, Jennifer (2016). "A DISCUSSION OF KINGSTON AND AREA'S HISTORIC SMALL HOUSES KNOWN AS "THE ONTARIO COTTAGE" TYPE" (PDF). Journal of the Society for the Study of Architecture in Canada. 41 (2): 65–81.
- National Gallery of Canada. "Emeric Essex Vidal, Niagara Falls, 1816".
- "Naval and Military Gazette". Naval and Military Gazette and Weekly Chronicle of the United Service and East India and Colonial Chronicle. 2 May 1840.
- Nesbitt, C.J.; Gardner, E.M. (1914). "Memoirs. Captain Richard Emeric Vidal, R.N., and Vice- Admiral Alexander Thomas Emeric Vidal, R.N., Pioneers of Upper Canada". Transactions of the Women's Historical Society of Toronto (13): 38–58.
- O'Byrne, William R. (1849). A naval biographical dictionary: comprising the life and services of every living officer in Her Majesty's navy, from the rank of admiral of the fleet to that of lieutenant, inclusive. Compiled from authentic and family documents. By William R. O'Byrne. London: Murray.
- Owen, Edward W.C. R. (1860). "The Commodore, Sir Edward W. C. R. Owen, Knight, commander of the most honorable military Order of the Bath, and Commander-in-Chief of his Britannic Majesty's ships and vessels employed in the West Indies and seas adjacent, to Commodore Porter, commanding the naval forces of the United States of North America, in the West Indies". In Dickins, Asbury; Forney, John W. (eds.). American State Papers: Naval Affairs. Vol. II. Washington: Gales & Seaton.
- "Portsmouth, Saturday Evening, Aug. 20". Hampshire Advertiser. 20 August 1836.
- Ruffhead, Owen, ed. (1786). The statutes at large from Magna Charta. Vol. 8. London: Eyre & Strahan.
- Shaw, Sir Charles (1837). Personal memoirs and correspondence, comprising a narrative of the war in Portugal and Spain from 1831 to 1837. Vol. I. London: Henry Colburn.
- Slatta, Richard W. (1982). "Pulperías and Contraband Capitalism in Nineteenth-Century Buenos Aires Province". The Americas. 38 (3). Cambridge University Press: 347–362. JSTOR 980726.
- Sluyter, Andrew (2010). "THE HISPANIC ATLANTIC'S TASAJO TRAIL". Latin American Research Review. 45 (1). The Latin American Studies Association: 98–120. doi:10.1353/lar.0.0114. JSTOR 27919177. S2CID 143080271.
- Smith, Robert C.; Wilder, Elizabeth (1948). A Guide to the Art of Latin America. Washington: Library of Congress.
- Stacey, C. P. (1950). "The Myth of the Unguarded Frontier 1815–1871". The American Historical Review. 56 (1). Oxford University Press for the American Historical Association: 1–18. JSTOR 1840618.
- Suárez, Alejandro Alberto (2004). "La extracción y el comercio de plumas de avestruz en el virreinato del Río de la Plata: Una relación tripartita entre indígenas, criollos y peninsulares". Revista de Historia de América (in Spanish). 134. Pan American Institute of Geography and History: 9–52. JSTOR 20140134.
- "The Evening Star". The Star. 10 October 1816.
- The Nautical Magazine and Naval Chronicle: A Journal of Papers on Subjects Connected with Maritime Affairs. Vol. 4. Simpkin, Marshall. 1835.
- "The gloomy rumours so industriously circulated last week". Sunday Times. 7 October 1832.
- "To be let... Ersham Lodge, Hailsham". Brighton Gazette. 26 September 1844.
- Trifilo, S. Samuel (1959). "A Bibliography of British Travel Books on Argentina: 1810–1860". The Americas. 16 (2). Cambridge University Press: 133–143. JSTOR 978837.
- Vidal, Emeric Essex (1820). Picturesque Illustrations of Buenos Ayres and Monte Video, Consisting of Twenty-four Views: Accompanied with Descriptions of the Scenery, and of the Costumes, Manners, &c., of the Inhabitants of Those Cities and Their Environs. London: Ackermann.
- "Wilmington Vicarage". Sussex Advertiser. 25 May 1835.
- Wilmot, A. Eardley (1838). "Voyage of HMS Actæon, Captain the Right Honourable Lord Russell. England to Valparaiso.". The Nautical Magazine and Naval Chronicle. London: Simpkin, Marshall.
- Young, Norwood (1915). Napoleon in Exile: St Helena (1815–1821). Vol. II. Philadelphia: John C. Winston.

=== Public records of the United Kingdom ===
- Calendar of the Grants of Probate and Letters of Administration made in the Probate Registries of the High Court of Justice in England. London: Principal Probate Registry.
- Census Returns of England and Wales, 1851 (Class: HO107; Piece: 1638; Page: 1; GSU roll: 193541). Kew, Surrey: The National Archives of the UK.
- Church of England Parish Registers: St Bride, Fleet Street. London: London Metropolitan Archives (P69/BRI/A/01/Ms 6542/3).
- Church of England Parish Registers: St Bride, Fleet Street. London: London Metropolitan Archives (P69/BRI/A/010/MS06542/005).
- "Notices" (PDF). London Gazette (13941). London. p. 978. 15 October 1796.
- Registers of Births, Marriages and Deaths surrendered to the Non-parochial Registers Commissions of 1837 and 1857 (Class Number: RG 4; Piece Number: 4238). Kew, Surrey: The National Archives of the UK; General Register Office.
- Registers of Births, Marriages and Deaths surrendered to the Non-parochial Registers Commissions of 1837 and 1857 (Class Number: RG 4; Piece Number: 4639). Kew, Surrey: The National Archives of the UK; General Register Office.
- Somerset Parish Records, 1538–1914 (D\P\ba.ss/2/1/6). Taunton, Somerset, England: Somerset Heritage Service.
- The Navy List. London: John Murray. October 1838.
