= List of pastors in Nigeria =

Pastors in Nigeria

This is a list of notable pastors in Nigeria, both present and past.

== Notable pastors ==
- Elijah Abina is the General Overseer of The Gospel Faith Mission International (GOFAMINT).
- Enoch Adeboye is a Nigerian pastor and the General Overseer of Redeemed Christian Church of God (RCCG).
- Paul Adefarasin, founder and senior pastor of House on the Rock.
- Godman Akinlabi, founder and senior pastor of The Elevation Church.
- Stephen Akinola (1953–2021) was the founder of Redemption Ministries Worldwide.
- Matthew Ashimolowo (born 17 March 1952 in Nigeria) is the senior pastor of Kingsway International Christian Centre.
- Joseph Ayo Babalola (1904–1959) was the founder of the Christ Apostolic Church.
- Tunde Bakare pastor of the Latter Rain Assembly. He once ran as vice presidential candidate of Muhammadu Buhari in the Nigerian presidential election, 2011.
- Chibuzor Gift Chinyere, Founder Omega Power Ministries (OPM)
- Done P. Dabale, founder of the United Methodist Church in Nigeria (UMCN).
- Jerry Eze, founder Streams of Joy International and convener of New Season Prophetic Prayers and Declaration (NSPPD) - a daily YouTube devotional prayer platform.
- Jeremiah Omoto Fufeyin, founder of Christ Mercyland Deliverance Ministry
- David Ibiyeomie, founder and senior pastor of Salvation Ministries.
- Benson Idahosa Founder of Church of God Mission International
- Margaret Idahosa Wife of Late Archbishop Benson Idahosa and Current Head of Church of God Mission International
- Cornelius Adam Igbudu, founder of the Anglican Adam Preaching Society
- Emmanuel Iren, pastor and the General Overseer of Celebration Church International.
- Joshua Iyemifokhae, pastor and author
- TB Joshua (1963–2021) was the Nigerian pastor and founder of the Synagogue, Church Of All Nations (SCOAN).
- Yomi Kasali, founder and senior pastor, Foundation of Truth Assembly, Surulere, Lagos State.
- William Kumuyi (born 1941) is a Nigerian pastor, evangelist, General-Overseer and founder of Deeper Christian Life Ministry.
- Lazarus Muoka, founder of "The Lord's Chosen Charismatic Revival Movement".
- Timothy Oluwole Obadare (1930–2013), founder of the World Soul Winning Evangelistic Ministry.
- Bola Odeleke, General Overseer of Power Pentecostal Church.
- Bimbo Odukoya (1960–2005) was a Nigerian pastor and televangelist who was the spouse of Taiwo Odukoya, the founder of the Fountain of Life Church.
- Taiwo Odukoya (1956–2023) was a Nigerian Pentecostal pastor and public speaker. He was the founder and senior pastor of The Fountain of Life Church.
- Chukwuemeka Cyril Ohanaemere, known as Odùméje, is the general overseer of The Mountain of Holy Ghost Intervention and Deliverance Ministry, and a musician.
- Chris Okotie (born 1958) is a Nigerian pastor, televangelist and founder and the General Overseer of the Household of God Church.
- S.O. Oladele (Inaugurated in 2021) is the 8th President and current head pastor of Christ Apostolic Church
- Daniel Kolawole Olukoya, Founder and General overseer of Mountain of Fire and Miracles Ministries
- Gabriel Olutola (born 1933 in Ilesa, Osun State) is a Nigerian pastor and president of The Apostolic Church Nigeria.
- Emmanuel Omale is a Nigerian charismatic pastor and televangelist. He is the leader and founder of Divine Hand of God Prophetic Ministry.
- Lawrence Onochie is a Nigerian pastor and the general overseer of The Kings Heritage Church.
- Ayo Oritsejafor is the founding and senior pastor of Word of Life Bible Church and the former president of the Christian Association of Nigeria.
- Samuel Oshoffa (1909–1985) was the founder of the Celestial Church of Christ (C.C.C.)
- Yemi Osinbajo, Vice President of Nigeria (2015–2023), former pastor in charge of Lagos Province 48 of the Redeemed Christian Church of God, Banana Island, Ikoyi.
- Chris Oyakhilome (known popularly as "Pastor Chris") is a Nigerian pastor, evangelist who is the founding president of Love World also known as Christ Embassy.
- Sam Oye (born 13 April 1974) is the founder and lead pastor of The Transforming Church Worldwide, and host of the Prophetic Prayer Hour.
- David Oyedepo (born 1954), Nigerian pastor, Christian author, preacher, the founder of Living Faith Church, popularly called Winners' Chapel.
- Joshua Selman (born 1980), founder and senior pastor of Eternity Network International (ENI) and convener of Koinonia, Abuja.
- Johnson Suleman, founder and senior pastor, Omega Fire Ministry, Auchi, Edo State.
- Moses Orimolade Tunolase, founder of Cherubim and Seraphim (Nigerian church)

== See also ==
- Christianity in Nigeria
