= Pentecostal Fellowship of Nigeria =

Pentecostal Christian organisation in Nigeria

- Abbreviation: PFN
- Classification: Christianity
- Orientation: Pentecostalism
- Scripture: Bible
- Structure: Non-denominational
- President: Emmanuel Iren
- Deputy President: Cosmas Ilechukwu
- Secretary: David Bakare
- Region: Nigeria
- Language: English
- Headquarters: Isolo, Lagos
- Origin: 1985; 41 years ago Lagos, Nigeria
- Official website: www.pfnlagosstate.org
- Slogan: We ought to love one another - (1 John 4:11)

The Pentecostal Fellowship of Nigeria (PFN) is a Christian organisation in Nigeria. It was founded in 1985 and serves as an umbrella body for several Pentecostal churches in Nigeria, promoting unity and cooperation among them. The organisation represents Pentecostal Christians in Nigeria and addresses certain social and religious issues in the country.

== History and background ==
The Pentecostal Fellowship of Nigeria (PFN) was founded in 1985 following the transformative Greater Lagos Crusade organised by Rev Uma Ukpai. This crusade brought together church leaders from different denominations, and paved the way for PFN's inception. This event occurred within the broader context of the Pentecostal movement in Nigeria, which began to gain momentum in the early 1900s. The movement experienced growth and influence within the country.

In subsequent decades, new denominations were founded, including the Christ Apostolic Church (CAC), the Celestial Church of Christ (CCC), Church of God Mission (COGM) and the Redeemed Christian Church of God (RCCG), amongst others.

By the 1980s, several other charismatic Pentecostal preachers and churches had emerged. It was during this period of expansion that the Pentecostal Fellowship of Nigeria was established in 1985.

Among the founding fathers of the PFN were Uma Ukpai of Uma Ukpai Evangelistic Association, Enoch Adeboye of The Redeemed Christian Church of God, Charles Osueke of Assemblies of God Nigeria, Obiorah Ezekiel of Christian Pentecostal Mission International, Elijah Abina of GOFAMINT, Wilson Badejo of Foursquare Gospel Church, Oterai of Gospel Church of Christ, William Kumuyi of Deeper Life Christian Ministries, Daniel Ogunkanmi of Christ Gospel Mission, Benson Idahosa of Church of God Mission INC, Mike Okonkwo of The Redeemed Evangelical Mission, Sam Ukaegbu of Faith Cathedral, and Abraham Oyeniran of Evangelical International Churches.

The organisation, composed of Classical Pentecostals, Indigenous Pentecostals and Neo Pentecostals, was inaugurated on 14 November 1986 in Lagos and was incorporated on 12 June 1989.

== Structure and governance ==
The Pentecostal Fellowship of Nigeria (PFN) comprises both national and state levels, each with its own leadership.

At the national level, PFN is headed by a Board of Trustees, the National Advisory Council, and the National Executive Council. The National Executive Council consists of the President, national deputy President, national secretary, treasurer, and national auditor.

The state chapters are led by a chairman and composed of appointed and elected officers, such as the state directors and province chairmen within the state. PFN also has a women and youth wing.

PFN comprises church leaders and members from various regions and denominations across Nigeria, which helps in promoting unity and the collective interests of the Pentecostal community. They have regular bi-annual meetings.

== Leadership ==
The PFN is executively led by the President, currently Francis Wale Oke, who served as the previous deputy President. He was elected for a four-year tenure by the National Advisory Council in March 2021, in Enugu, Nigeria. He was re-elected for another four years in February 2025 at the 18th Biennial Conference in Abuja. Alongside the President is the national deputy President, currently Cosmas Ilechukwu, national secretary, currently David Bakare, treasurer, currently Sam Aboyeji and national auditor, currently a representative of The Redeemed Christian Church Of God.

=== Past presidents ===
Since its inception in 1985, the PFN has had several presidents serving different tenure within the organisation. Below is a list of all the presidents of the PFN:

| Order | President | Period | Denomination |
|---|---|---|---|
| 1 | James A. Boyejo | 1985 – 1992 | Foursquare Gospel Church |
| 2 | Enoch Adeboye | 1992–1995 | Redeemed Christian Church of God |
| 3 | Benson Idahosa | 1995–1998 | Church of God Mission |
| 4 | Mike Okonkwo | 1998–2007 | The Redeemed Evangelical Mission |
| 5 | Ayo Oritsejafor | 2007–2013 | Word of Life Bible Church |
| 6 | Felix Omobude | 2013–2021 | Gospel Light International Ministries |
| 7 | Francis Wale Oke | 2021–present | Sword of the Spirit Ministries |

== Beliefs and community engagement ==
The Pentecostal Fellowship of Nigeria anchors its beliefs in the core theological doctrines and spiritual practices of the Pentecostal community. The PFN generally adheres to the Bible, as the 'living word'. It believes in the universal sinfulness of mankind and emphasises the teachings of salvation though Jesus Christ and the concept of the triune God. Equally, it also believes in the Lords Supper, which is a ceremonial rite that symbolises taking an emblem of the blood and body of Christ, according to 1 Corinthians 11:23–29; the baptism of the Holy Spirit with an evidence of tongues as stated in Acts 2:4; the return of Christ and a new heaven and earth after the final judgement of man. Other tenets include water baptism by immersion, holiness and divine healing.

The PFN also articulates a Code of Ethics aimed at guiding the conduct of its members. This code encompasses principles such as the sanctity of marriage among believers, Christian modesty in attire, brotherly tolerance, and unity in essential aspects of faith. The PFN opens to Pentecostal churches, organisations, and individuals who align with its doctrinal stance and ethical principles.

In addition to its doctrinal stance, PFN participates in community engagement initiatives to address certain societal needs.

Some of these initiatives include the establishment of a TradeFair programme in South West Nigeria in 2007 to support small businesses, donation of grinding machines, motorcycles and generators for financial empowerment, provision of educational materials in certain schools, and sponsorship of about 200 Christian youths for training and skills acquisition at ISAC (International Skills Acquisition Center) in Nasarawa State in 2021.

In 2018, the national youth coordinator of Pentecostal Fellowship of Nigeria, Rev David Ize-Iyamu launched a Youth Revolution Movement (YRM) to prepare young Nigerians for leadership, governance, and participation in the electoral process. He said that the movement was to inform, educate, lead, and sensitise youths to action and participation in the political value-chain. The organisation also stated that it would engage the Federal Government and other religious and interest groups to find lasting solutions to Nigeria's security, political and socio-economic challenges.

== See also ==
- Christian Association of Nigeria
