= Francis Wale Oke =

Nigerian author and televangelist

Archbishop Francis Wale Oke
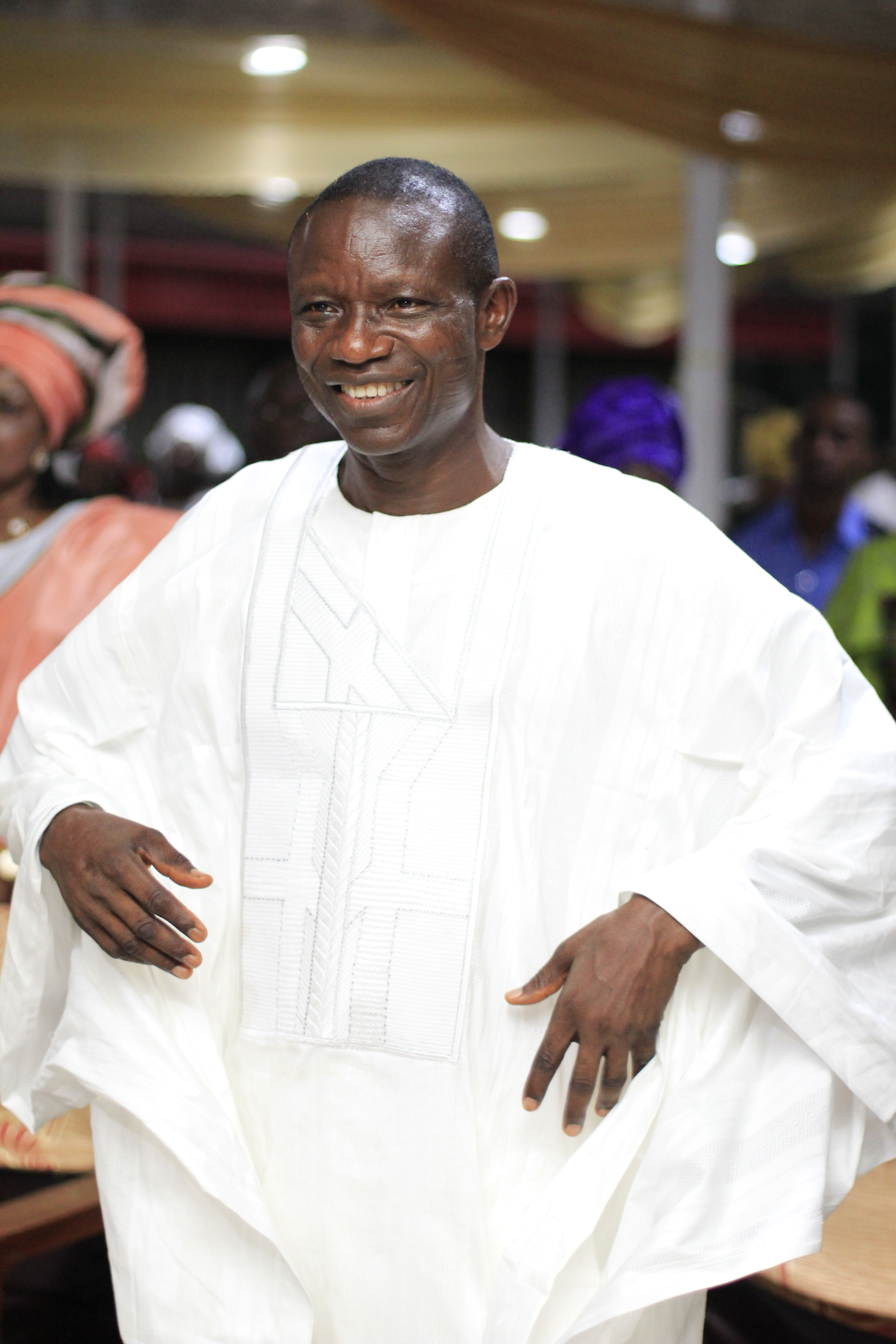

7th President of PFN
- Incumbent
- Assumed office 3 March 2021
- Deputy: Cosmas Ilechukwu; John Praise Daniel (2021–2025)
- Preceded by: Felix Omobude

Chancellor of Precious Cornerstone University
- Incumbent
- Assumed office 11 November 2022
- Vice-Chancellor: Julius Oloke
- Preceded by: Office established

Personal details
- Born: Francis Olubowale Aderibigbe Oke; 8 September 1956 (age 70) Oyo State, Nigeria
- Spouse: Victoria Tokunbo Oke (m. 1983)
- Children: 2
- Education: University of Lagos
- Occupation: Pastor; author; televangelist

Francis Olubowale Aderibigbe Oke (born 8 September 1956) is a Nigerian author, Christian leader, and televangelist. He is the founder and presiding Bishop of Sword of the Spirit Ministries. Since 2021, he has served as the President of the Pentecostal Fellowship of Nigeria (PFN), a Christian body representing millions of Pentecostals. He has also been the Chancellor of Precious Cornerstone University (PCU) in Ibadan since 2022.

== Early life ==
Oke was born on 8 September 1956 in Kasumu village, Egbeda local government area of Oyo State, Nigeria. He spent his formative years in Kasumu before relocating to Ibadan at the age of 11. In Ibadan, he attended Wesley Teachers' College and later furthered his education at Ibadan Polytechnic. He subsequently gained admission to the University of Lagos, where he studied Land and Engineering Survey.

== Ministry and leadership ==
Oke began his ministry as a lay preacher in his home fellowship, CAET, in Ibadan. He also served as a Bible Study leader under Enoch Adeboye in Christ Redeemers Ministry. While at the University of Lagos, Oke was involved in the Lagos Varsity Christian Union, where he served as Bible Study Secretary for one year and later as President for two and a half years.

During his time at the university, he felt called to the ministry and became associated with influential figures in Nigerian Christianity, including Enoch Adeboye, Kumuyi, Benson Idahosa, and David Oyedepo. Oke formally responded to his calling in December 1975 and established Sword of the Spirit Ministries in Ibadan, Oyo State, following his university education. He transitioned to full-time ministry on 17 May 1982.

After a period of itinerant ministry across Nigeria, he founded Christ Life Church in February 1989 – a church arm of the Sword of the Spirit Ministries. The following year, he established the International Bible College of Ministries (IBCOMS) in May 1990 to train individuals for ministry.

He hosts "The Voice of the Lord", a daily broadcast aired on Nigeria national radio and television stations FRCN and NTA, Ibadan. He also leads The Nigeria Turning Point, a prayer and intercession programme in the Federal Capital Territory (FCT), Abuja.

In 1999, he was consecrated as a Bishop. Oke hosts an Annual Holy Ghost Convention. Under his leadership, Sword of the Spirit Ministries expanded within Nigeria and to other countries such as the United Kingdom, Russia, and the United States.

On 3 March 2021, he was elected as the 7th and current President of the Pentecostal Fellowship of Nigeria by the National Advisory Council for a four-year tenure, after previously serving as the Deputy President. He was re-elected in February 2025 for another four years. He is also a co-founder of Precious Cornerstone University in Ibadan, Oyo State, where he has served as Chancellor since 11 November 2022. He became Archbishop in September 2026.

== Personal life ==
Francis Wale Oke is married to Victoria Tokunbo Oke. After proposing to her on 19 May 1982, the couple got married on 17 December 1983. Together, they had two children. Their daughter, Dorcas, died in 2001 due to complications related to adulterated drugs. In response to this loss, they established the Dorcas Oke Hope Alive Initiative (DOHAL), a humanitarian organisation dedicated to addressing health, humanitarian, and poverty-related issues affecting African youth and children, in memory of their daughter.

== Awards and recognition ==
Oke received an honorary doctorate from All Nations for Christ Bible Institute in November 1991 for his contributions to world evangelism, under the auspices of Oral Roberts University. He was also honoured with the Federal Radio Corporation of Nigeria's (FRCN) award for contributions to religious harmony and human development. In 2024, he was presented with a Meritorious Award of Excellence by Isaac Idahosa in recognition of his contributions to Christian ministry.

== See also ==
- Enoch Adeboye
- Stephen Akinola
