= The Redeemed Evangelical Mission =

Pentecostal church and denomination

- Abbreviation: TREM
- Type: Christianity
- Classification: Protestant
- Orientation: Protestant
- Scripture: Bible
- Founder: Mike Okonkwo
- Region: Worldwide, especially Nigeria
- Founder: Mike Okonkwo
- Origin: 4th January, 1981; Lagos, Nigeria
- Official website: trem.org

The Redeemed Evangelical Mission (TREM) is a Pentecostal Christian denomination with headquarters in Lagos, Nigeria.

== History ==
The Redeemed Evangelical Mission (TREM) was officially launched by Bishop Mike Okonkwo on 4 January 1981. The ministry has its headquarters at Obanikoro/Anthony Oke, Lagos. The group also conducts outreach and charity relief work.

TREM holds an annual convention called Kingdom Life World Conference, which has had speakers including:

Nigerian Ministers

- Pastor Enoch Adeboye – General Overseer, Redeemed Christian Church of God (RCCG).
- Archbishop Benson Idahosa (late) – Founder, Church of God Mission International.
- Pastor Ayo Oritsejafor – Founder, Word of Life Bible Church.
- Dr. Felix Omobude – General Superintendent, Gospel Light International Ministries.
- Bishop Francis Wale Oke – Presiding Bishop, Sword of the Spirit Ministries.
- Bishop Simeon Okah – Presiding Bishop, Flock of Christ Mission.

International Ministers

- Dr. Mensa Otabil – Founder, International Central Gospel Church (ICGC), Ghana.
- Bishop Tudor Bismark – Founder, Jabula New Life Ministries International, Zimbabwe.
- Bishop Charles Agyinasare – Founder, Perez Chapel International, Ghana.
- Pastor Matthew Ashimolowo – Senior Pastor, Kingsway International Christian Centre (KICC), UK. Politicians including Peter Obi, Yemi Osinbajo, Babatunde Fashola have also visited the mission.

They also hold a musical concert called Zamar, to which they invited gospel musicians including Nathaniel Bassey, Beejay Sax, Dunsin Oyekan, Eben, Neon Adejo and Sunmisola Agbebi. In 2023 they held a Word Celebration.
