= Ernest Izevbigie =

Nigerian academic

Ernest Izevbigie NAI is a Nigerian Professor of Biochemistry and former Vice Chancellor of Benson Idahosa University in Nigeria. He has applied modern scientific techniques to study and examine the health benefits of plants in Nigeria.

== Early life and career ==
Ernest Izevbigie was born and raised by the Izevbigie family in Benin City, Edo State Nigeria. He completed his Primary and Secondary Schools education in the year 1978, he was very young at the time. In 1982, he moved to the United States (USA) for his post-secondary education. He received his Bachelor of Science degree from Tennessee State University, Nashville, Tennessee in 1986 and received his master's degree from the University of Tennessee, Knoxville, Tennessee U.S.A in 1988. He then proceeded to Michigan State University East Lansing, Michigan where he received his PhD. degree in Growth Biology/ Biochemistry in the year 1996.

== Honors ==
During the Charter class of 2012, he was awarded the distinction of NAI Charter Fellow amongst 100 top-world scientists and esteemed innovators.

Other honors and acknowledgements are:

- Jackson State University (JSU) Research Innovation Award, 2006
- JSU 2003/2004 Group Research Award, October, 2004
- JSU 2003/2004 Inventor Award, October, 2004
- JUS 2003/2004 Technology Transfer Award, October, 2004
- United States of America National Academy of Inventors 2012 Fellow. Commendation from the United States 113th (2012-2014) Congress

Academic offices
Preceded by MacDonald Idu	Vice-Chancellor of Benson Idahosa University; 2013–2018	Succeeded by Sam Guobadia
