= Ikeji-Arakeji =

Ikeji Arakeji is a town in the Oriade local government area of Osun State, Nigeria. It is located in the west of Nigeria, 37 km (23 mi) from Akure (capital of Ondo State). The people are of the Ijesha tribe of the Yoruba ethnic group. The inhabitants are majorly farmers and Christians. The people of Ikeji Arakeji originally migrated from Ikeji Ile in the early 1900s. The Joseph Ayo Babalola University is a private Nigerian university in Ikeji-Arakeji, in Osun State, established by the Christ Apostolic Church worldwide. The university is named after the first spiritual leader of the Christ Apostolic Church, Joseph Ayo Babalola (1904–1959).

== The migration to Arakeji ==
Arakeji is the principal deity of the town, now known as old Ikeji. The town, the original settlement (Ikeji Ile) had a very hilly topography and was not the ideal location for good communication, although it was good for security purposes. The town itself was rugged and suffered from erosion. It was against this background that the British Administrative officer in 1918 advised the community to move from Ikeji Ile (old Ikeji) to new site so as to make the town readily accessible for regular communications and establishment of social amenities. The Advice was acceptable and the former Agamo now the present site Ikeji Arakeji was chosen.
