= Foluke =

Foluke may refer to:

== People ==
=== First name ===
- Foluke Adeboye (born 1948), pastor and televangelist
- Foluke Daramola (born 1978), Nigerian actress
- Foluke Gunderson (born 1987), indoor volleyball player

=== Middle name ===
- Stella Foluke Osafile, Nigerian politician
