= Idahosa =

Idahosa is a surname. Notable people with the surname include:

- Benson Idahosa (1938–1998), Nigerian religious leader
- Helen Idahosa (born 1972), Nigerian weightlifter
- Margaret Idahosa (born 1943), Nigerian religious leader, wife of Benson
- Isaac Idahosa (born 1965), Nigerian politician
