= Precious Cornerstone University =

Nigerian private university

- Type: Private
- Established: 2017
- Chancellor: Francis Wale Oke
- Vice-Chancellor: Professor Timothy Olubisi Adejumo
- Location: Ibadan, Oyo State, Nigeria
- Campus: Urban
- Website: pcu.edu.ng

Precious Cornerstone University is a Nigerian Private University founded in 2017 and located in Ibadan, Oyo State in Nigeria. The institution is established by the Sword of the Spirit Ministries, a popular Pentecostal church in Ibadan, Oyo State, a church presided by Bishop Francis Wale Oke.

Its vice-chancellor is Professor Timothy Olubisi Adejumo.

The school had its first matriculation ceremony in 2019 and the school matriculated 78 pioneer students into the institution on the set date.
