= Felix Omobude =

Nigerian televangelist and author

Reverend Felix Omobude
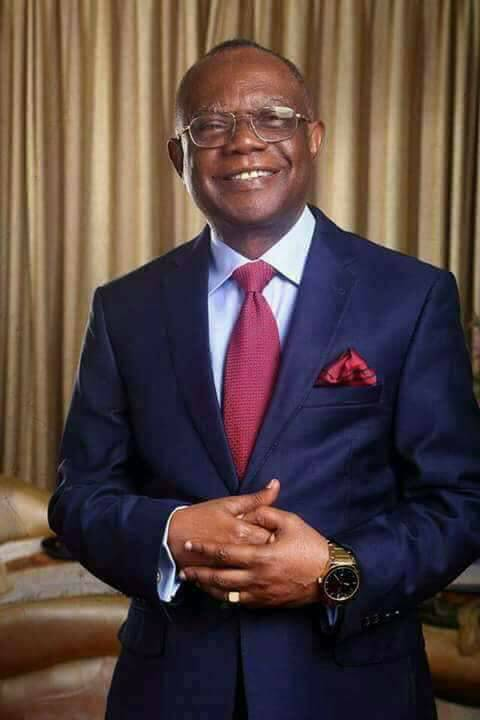

6th President of PFN
- In office 2013–2021
- Preceded by: Ayo Oritsejafor
- Succeeded by: Francis Wale Oke
- Deputy: Francis Wale Oke

Personal details
- Born: Felix Ilaweagbon Omobude; 14 March 1946 (age 80) Evbuobanosa (formerly known as Owa) in Orhionmwon Local Government Area of Edo State, Nigeria
- Spouse: Mrs. Abiola Theodora Omobude
- Children: Reverend Ebenezer Omobude and Sarah Omobude
- Occupation: Preacher and author
- Website: Felix Omobude

Felix Ilaweagbon Omobude (born 14 March 1946) is a Nigerian Christian leader, preacher, and the General Superintendent of Gospel Light International Ministries.

== Early life ==
Felix Ilaweagbon Omobude was born on 14 March 1946, in Evbuobanosa (formerly known as Owa) in Orhionmwon Local Government Area of Edo State, Nigeria. Despite growing up in humble circumstances as the third child in a family of fourteen children, he developed a passion for education and a desire to help others in their educational pursuits.

== Education ==
Omobude completed his Full Technological Certificate from the City & Guilds of London Institute in 1974 and earned a certificate from the Council of Engineering Institute Examination in London. He furthered his theological studies at Christ for the Nations Institute in Dallas, Texas, obtaining a certificate in theology in 1981. Later, in 1984, he earned a Phd (D.Min) from the same institute. In 1986, he was awarded an honorary doctorate in divinity from San Antonio Theological Seminary in the United States.

== Ministry and leadership roles ==
Omobude served on the pastoral team of the Church of God Mission International under the late Archbishop Benson Idahosa before establishing the Gospel Light International Ministries (New Covenant Gospel Church) in 1988. The ministry has its international headquarters in Benin City, Nigeria, and has branches across the nation and beyond.

Omobude has been actively involved in various national and international Christian organizations. He served as the President of the Pentecostal Fellowship of Nigeria (PFN) and as a member of the National Board of Advisors for the PFN. He has also held positions such as the National Representative for ICARE Inc in Yuma, Arizona, and a member of the Board of Elders for Faith Community Churches International in Tucson, Arizona, US

== Family life ==
Omobude is married to Pastor Mrs. Abiola Theodora Omobude, a gospel singer and preacher. They have two children, Reverend Ebenezer Omobude and Sarah Omobude.

== Publications ==
- You Are His Choice
- Flaming Fire
- A Cry in the Wilderness
- The Holy Spirit
- Spiritual Maturity
- I Sat Where They Sat
- Releasing the Power of the Tithe
- The Power of an Endless Life
- Whose Son Are You?
