= PFN =

PFN may refer to:

== Business and organisations ==
- Parti des forces nouvelles (Party of New Forces), a French far right political party formed in 1974
- Party of New Forces (Belgium) (Parti des forces nouvelles), a Belgian far right political party formed in 1975
- Pentecostal Fellowship of Nigeria, a Pentecostal Christian organisation in Nigeria
- Produksi Film Negara, an Indonesian film company

== Technology ==
- Pulse-forming network, an electric circuit
- Page frame number, of computer memory in an operating system

== Other uses ==
- Panama City–Bay County International Airport (IATA code), a former airport in Florida, US
