= Chibuzor =

- Gender: Male
- Language: Igbo

Origin
- Origin: Igbo
- Meaning: chi leads the way or chi is the way
- Region of origin: Igboland

Chibuzor audio is a masculine given name of the Igbo ethnic group in Nigeria. The name means "chi leads the way" or "chi is the way".

== Notable people with the name ==
- Chibuzor Chilaka (born 1986), Nigerian footballer
- Chibuzor Gift Chinyere (born 1973), Nigerian pastor and televangelist
- Chibuzo Nelson Azubuike Ezege, known as Phyno (born 1986), Nigerian rapper and singer
- Chibuzor Nwakanma (c. 1965–2022), Nigerian footballer
- Chibuzor Nwogbo (born 1990), Nigerian footballer
- Chibuzor Oji, known as Faze, Nigerian musician and actor
- Chibuzor Okonkwo (born 1988), Nigerian footballer

== See also ==
- Chibuzo
