= Kumuyi =

Kumuyi is a Yoruba surname. Notable people with the surname include:

- Abiodun Kumuyi, Nigerian editor, wife of William
- William Kumuyi (born 1941), Nigerian evangelist
