= Stephen Akinola =

Nigerian Pentecostal Pastor

Reverend Stephen Akinola
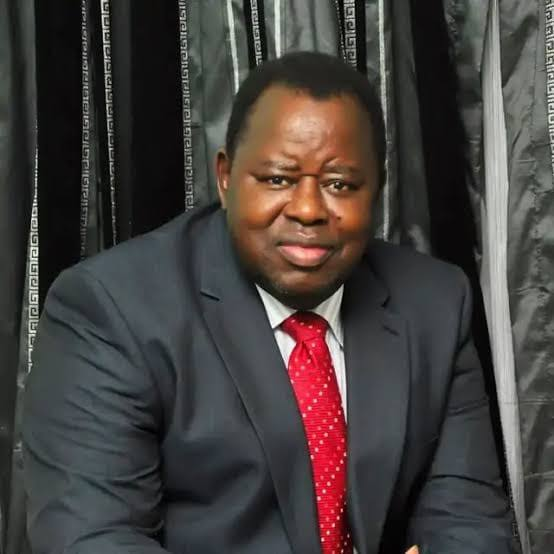
- Born: Stephen Oluwole Akinola; March 4, 1953; Tamale, Northern Gold Coast (now Ghana)
- Died: June 6, 2021 (aged 68); Abuja, Nigeria
- Resting place: Port Harcourt, Nigeria
- Education: Yaba College of Technology, Lagos
- Occupation: • Pastor • author • evangelist
- Known for: Wind and Fire Conference
- Successor: Pastor Cletus Desmond

Stephen Oluwole Akinola (4 March 1953 – 6 June 2021) was a Ghanaian-born Nigerian Pentecostal preacher. He was the founder and General Overseer of Redemption Ministries Worldwide.

Akinola received recognition for his contributions to spiritual growth and community development. He was acknowledged for his "commitment to faith and spirituality". In 2019, he was described as a great man of faith and mentor to the Government of Rivers State by the former Deputy Governor of the state, Dr. Ipalibo Banigo, during a special Adoration Thanksgiving Service at Redemption Ministries, Omega Beach.

== Early life ==
Stephen Oluwole Akinola was born on March 4, 1953, in Tamale, Northern Ghana, to Samuel and Marian Otunde. His early education began at age 4 in Damagos, Ghana. He later attended Government Secondary School, Tamale, before returning to Nigeria in 1971. Upon his return to Nigeria, he became a teacher at the Baptist Primary School, Igboho, Oyo State – his place of origin. In 1973, he pursued further studies at Yaba College of Technology, Lagos.

== Ministry ==
Akinola described experiencing a profound religious awakening in 1974:

I came under a serious conviction in the lecture hall. When I rose up from my knees, it was like a 12-storey building had been lifted off my head. A mighty weight left me, and I knew I was free. Every single thing I saw looked different. The flowers looked different, the trees looked different. It appeared to me the world had changed. I walked back to the lecture hall, a new man.

This experience led him to participate in Bible study sessions at Pastor W.F. Kumuyi's residence in the University of Lagos and become involved in what later developed into the Deeper Christian Life Ministry – one of the fastest growing churches in Africa.

In 1977, Akinola played a role in establishing the Deeper Christian Life Ministry in Rivers State. According to reports, by 1986, the membership at the Port Harcourt headquarters of the Deeper Life Church had increased to over 5,000 adults, leading to the introduction of two Sunday services.

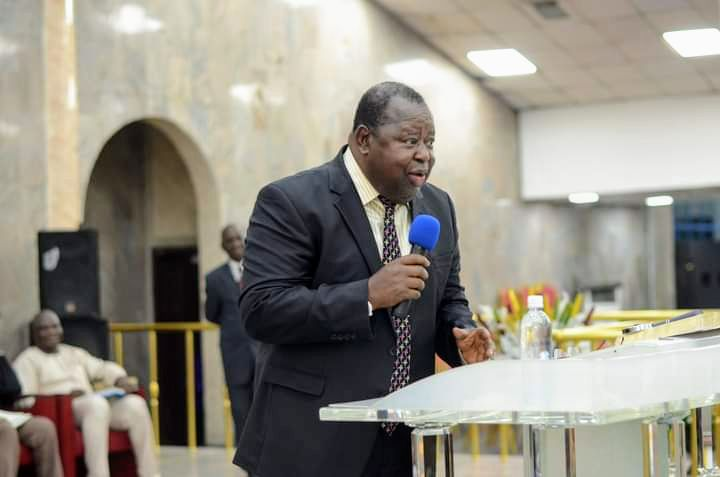
Akinola delivering a sermon at Redemption Ministries headquarters in 2019.

Later in 1987, after withdrawing from the Deeper Life Church, he founded Redemption Ministries, which expanded internationally, with branches in the United Kingdom, Canada, and Brazil.

As General Overseer of Redemption Ministries Worldwide, Akinola was involved in organising various programmes aimed at spiritual growth and community engagement, which received recognition from the Rivers State Government. Some of these programmes include: the annual Wind and Fire Conference, held in December, and featuring guest speakers such as Bishop Kingsley Enakirerhi. Additionally, the Divine Daughters of Destiny International programme focuses on women’s empowerment and often hosts Reverend Dr. Uma Ukpai as a guest speaker.

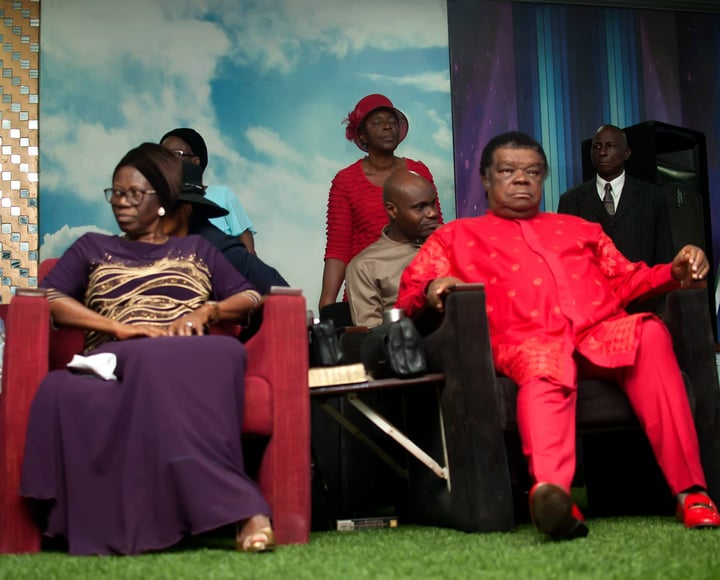
Rev Uma and his wife at a Divine Daughters of Destiny International Programme, Omega Beach.

Another initiative is the annual Kabash programme, catering to the spiritual needs of the church’s youth.

== Personal life ==
Akinola was married to Matilda Ayebatonye Akinola.

== Death ==
Akinola died on June 6, 2021, at a hospital in Abuja. His death was confirmed by his church and other prominent figures, including the former chairman of the Christian Association of Nigeria in Rivers State, Apostle Eugene Ogu. He was interred within the premises of his church. During his funeral, Nyesom Wike of Rivers State, represented by his deputy, Ipalibo Harry Banigo, expressed the state's appreciation for Akinola's impact, highlighting his contributions to spiritual growth and initiatives like the Wind and Fire Conference and Suya Night.

Following his death, Cletus Desmond was ordained as the succeeding General Overseer of Redemption Ministries Worldwide.

== See also ==
- T.B. Joshua
- David Oyedepo
