= Ruth Elton =

British-born Nigerian missionary (1933–2025)

- Born: Ruth Hannah Elton; 7 September 1933; United Kingdom
- Died: 30 August 2025 (aged 91); Sharon Compound, Alafia Bamin Quarters, Ilesa, Osun State, Nigeria
- Other names: Omotere, Ometere
- Occupations: Christian missionary, Author
- Years active: 1937–2025
- Known for: Oldest missionary in Nigeria, Public health advocacy in Okene
- Parent(s): Sydney Granville Elton (father); Hannah Elton (mother)
- Relatives: Elton family

Ruth Elton (7 September 1933 – 30 August 2025) was a British-Nigerian Christian missionary. She was the only child of Sydney Granville and Hannah Elton, deceased British missionaries who are commonly regarded as pioneers of the Pentecostal revival movement in Nigeria.

== Early life and missionary work ==
Ruth Elton relocated to Nigeria along with her parents in July 1937 at about the age of 3. Her father, Sydney Granville "Pa" Elton, had been posted to Nigeria as an Area Superintendent of The Apostolic Church of Nigeria, which was then under Joseph Ayo Babalola. She spent her younger years in Okene. Her father remained in Nigeria for 50 years until his death in Ilesa in 1987.

Like her parents, Ruth became a missionary and served in Egbe, Ebirra, Okene, Koton Karfe and other parts of present-day Kogi, Ondo, Oyo and Osun states before retiring from active missionary work and permanently settling in Ilesa.

At some point in her early years, Ruth trained in sewing, handwork and arts at a technical college in the United Kingdom. Elton, who remained celibate and unmarried her whole life, was polyglot - she spoke English, Yoruba and Ebira languages fluently. In 1975, she had to renounce her British citizenship to naturalize as a Nigerian, as it was impossible then to hold a dual citizenship.

Together with her missionary work, she contributed to taming infant mortality owing to poor childcare and hygiene and the practice of force-feeding, particularly in Okene, Kogi during the late colonial and early postcolonial years.

Elton authored three Christian books: The Gospel of the Kingdom; Your Citizenship: Hell or the Kingdom?; and The Kingdom Has Come.

Elton died on 30 August 2025, at the age of 91.
