= Yoruba iconoclasm =

Yoruba Iconoclasm began in the 20th century. In the Yoruba context, objects are usually destroyed for religious reasons, with the widespread adoption of Christianity by Yoruba people after British colonization in the 1900s leading to the notion that native Yoruba artworks are icons that need to be destroyed. In recent times, this view of traditional Yoruba art as icons to be destroyed is being challenged and many efforts to preserve Yoruba art and heritage have been undertaken by activists.

== Historical context ==
In exploring the historical context of Yoruba art, a compelling narrative emerges that traces its evolution from periods of iconoclastic activity to eventual recognition as cultural heritage. Yoruba artistic traditions have long been integral to the cultural fabric of Nigeria, embodying a complex interplay of spiritual, social, and political dimensions. Initially, during colonial and post-colonial upheaval moments, Yoruba art faced challenges from iconoclastic forces that sought to diminish its significance—this period marked a critical juncture where traditional artworks were often viewed as relics of a bygone era, subject to neglect or even destruction in the name of modernity and progress.

However, amidst these challenges, Yoruba artists and cultural advocates began to reclaim and reinterpret their artistic heritage. The Osogbo Art Movement stands out as a pivotal example of this transformation. Emerging in the mid-20th century, the movement blended traditional Yoruba aesthetics with modern artistic techniques, revitalizing ancient forms while adapting them to contemporary contexts. By doing so, the artists preserved Yoruba cultural expressions and asserted their relevance in a changing world. This period of artistic revival marked a significant shift from mere preservation to active celebration and reinterpretation of Yoruba art as a dynamic and living heritage.

Today, Yoruba art continues to evolve, bridging past traditions with present-day realities. The transition from iconoclastic challenges to heritage recognition underscores a broader societal shift towards valuing indigenous knowledge systems and cultural practices.

== Religious iconoclasm ==
Traditional art in Yoruba culture is linked to the Orishas, the deities of native Yoruba spirituality. Orishas clash with the teachings of Christianity and Islam, and so when these religions became widespread in Yoruba culture in the 1900s, icons of orishas became special targets for iconoclasm.

=== Christian iconoclasm ===
There are many instances of Christian iconoclasm in Yoruba culture. In Evangelical Christianity, renouncing Orishas and handing in religious idols and equipment was a major part of the conversion process. Prophets like Apostle Joseph Ayo Babalola lead large revival meetings where iconoclasm was done on a mass scale. Religious objects like masks, leather wallets, and shrine figures were common items that were destroyed.

=== Muslim iconoclasm ===
In Yoruba culture, Islam accommodated Orishas by Islamicizing them as Maleka (angels) or Anjou (demons). As such, there is no strong evidence of widespread iconoclasm attributed to Islam in Yoruba culture.

== The reinvention of images in Yoruba culture ==
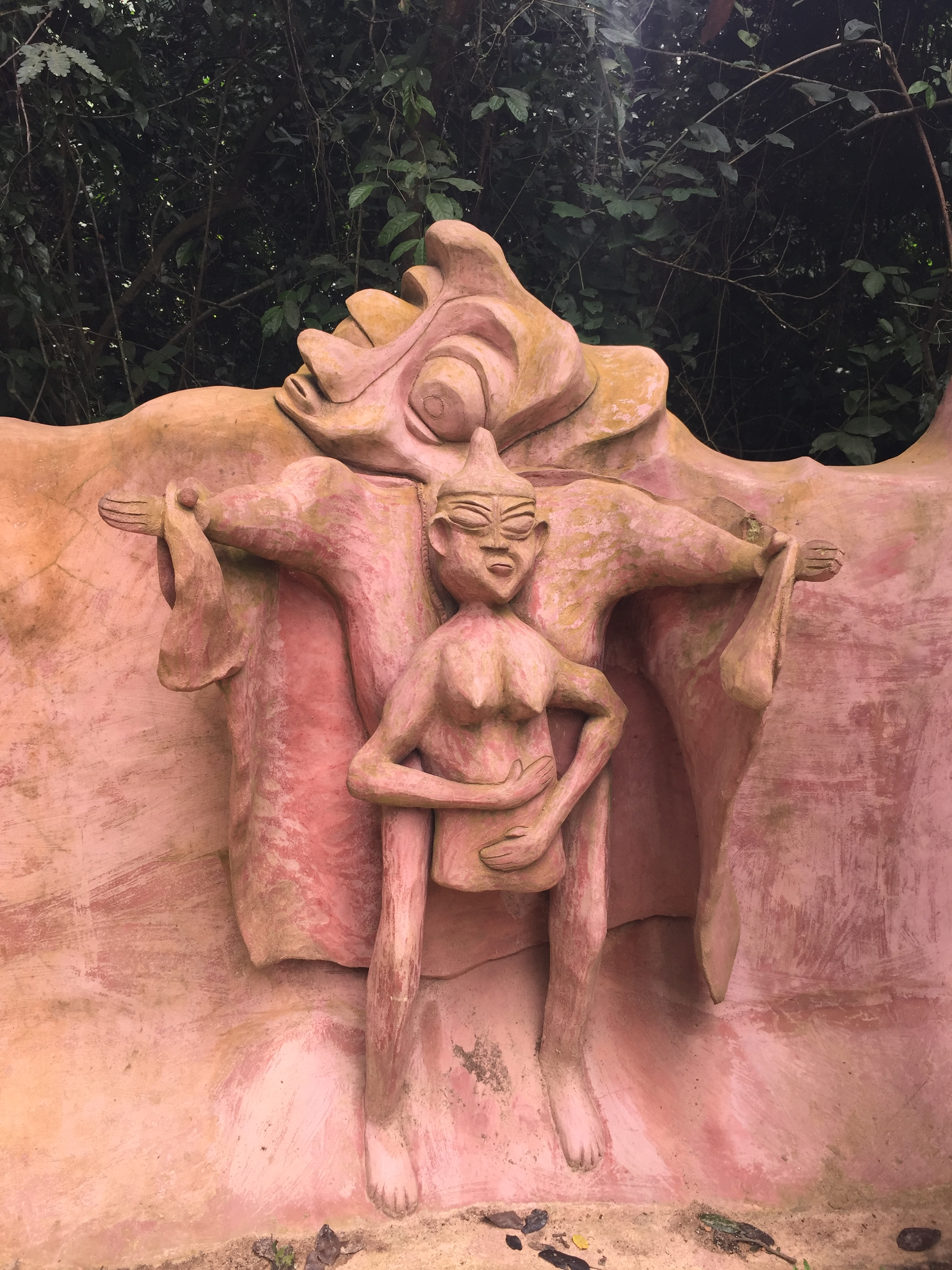
Statue of mystical being at the Osun-Osogbo sacred Grove

During the period of colonization by the British, sculptures and other depictions of Yoruba deities, namely the river goddess Osun, were destroyed and demonized as Christianity was forced onto them. Post-colonization, the Yoruba people in the kingdom of Osogbo have been enduring a period of iconoclash between two different lines of thought. There are those who claim a modernist identity, constructing images of Christian icons and symbols, and creating art that appeals internationally. In opposition are those who believe that to be able to claim their art as Nigerian, it is necessary to release themselves from the colonial ideology of modernism and reject traditional Yoruba art styles as primitive.

The iconoclash sometimes evolves into iconoclasm, with Christian figures destroying images that are produced, resembling traditional idols that were destroyed during British colonialism. Rev. Fr. Adebayo, a former priest in charge of St. Agnes, was said to have “destroyed an image of Our Lady that he perceived as unpleasant and resembling a fetish.” The destruction of modern and traditional interpretations of Christian figures is often the response to the art created by Yoruba artists and people who attempt to blend their heritage: pre-colonialism to their religious affiliation: post-colonialism.

== Modern day implications ==
Through iconoclasm much of Yoruba cultural artifacts have been destroyed or misplaced, which is currently contributing to the loss of heritage the Yoruba people are facing. As a result of colonialism many African artifacts reside in Europe, and were used as trophies in their conquest of African countries. There are contemporary debates happening that are advocating the repatriation of the art, meaning it should be returned to the countries that they were stolen from, in an attempt to decolonize African countries.

Individuals in favor of returning works of art back to their place of origin argue that taking these actions will help repair some of the cultural heritage that was destroyed. Art historians note that when the art is reinstated it should be up to local communities what art is returned, and what should be done with it after the fact.
