= Agbonifo =

Agbonifo is a surname. Notable people with the surname include:

- Eghosa Asemota Agbonifo (born 1985), Nigerian businessman
- Jeremy Agbonifo (born 2005), Nigerian footballer
