= David Ibiyeomie =

Nigerian pastor and televangelist (born 1962)

- Born: David Ibiyeomie; 21 October 1962 (age 64); Bolo in Ogu/Bolo LGA Rivers State, Nigeria
- Occupation: Televangelist
- Spouse: Peace Ibiyeomie (m. 1996)
- Children: 1
- Website: smhos.org

David Ibiyeomie (born 21 October 1962) is a Nigerian pastor, author, televangelist and the founder/presiding pastor of Salvation Ministries with its headquarters located in GRA, Port Harcourt, Rivers State, Nigeria.

== Early life ==
On October 21, 1962, David Ibiyeomie was born in Bonny Island, Rivers State, Niger Delta region of Nigeria. He is a native of Bolo Town in Ogu/Bolo Local Government Area of Rivers state.

== Education ==
David Ibiyeomie attended Banham Primary School and Government Comprehensive Secondary School Borikiri, all in Rivers State for his primary and secondary education. In 1980, he enrolled into the University of Science and Technology, Port Harcourt.

== Training ==
In 1995, Ibiyeomie enrolled into full time Bible School in the Word of Faith Bible Institute, an arm of Bishop David Oyedepo’s Ministry. Ibiyeomie started Salvation Ministries on Sunday April 13, 1997, with 34 persons in attendance.

== Career ==
After completing his Bible School training at Bishop David Oyedepo's Word of Faith Bible Institute (WOFBI), Ibiyeomie started a house fellowship with his family in Victoria Island, Lagos. He later moved to Port Harcourt, Rivers State, where he started Salvation Ministries (Glorious Chapel) on April 13, 1997, with a little over twenty members in attendance.

In July 1997, the church relocated to a larger plot of land. As of 2017, Salvation Ministries averages about 50,000 attendees every Sunday at its headquarters. In February 2011, Salvation Ministries started 14 satellite churches in one day, with all running five services each.

== Ministry ==
Through his television ministry Hour of Salvation and live services, David Ibiyeomie reaches millions of worshippers. The Hour of Salvation TV programme started on Nigerian Television Authority (NTA) channel 10 Port Harcourt, Rivers State, Nigeria in 2001 and currently runs on over 40 television stations both locally and internationally. He is an author and hosts an internet radio show.

The Hand of God Cathedral, the headquarters of Salvation Ministries in Igwuruta, along Port Harcourt Airport Road in Rivers State, was completed and dedicated by David Oyedepo on 6 November 2026. The cathedral has a reported seating capacity of 120,000 and covers approximately 56,130 square metres. At the dedication ceremony, Ibiyeomie stated that the project had been completed without loans or foreign aid.

== Controversies ==
Ibiyeomie has been controversial on multiple occasions. In January 2017, Ibiyeomie was alleged to have made prejudiced comments against the Ogoni people, leading the Movement for the Survival of the Ogoni People to demand that he apologise.

In March 2017, journalist Kemi Omololu-Olunloyo alleged that Ibiyeomie was having an affair with Nollywood actress Iyabo Ojo. Olunloyo was subsequently arrested and refused bail for defamation. However she has been released. Ibiyeomie strongly denied the allegations.

== See also ==
- List of people from Rivers State
- List of pastors in Nigeria
