= St John the Baptist, Kentish Town =

Church in London, England

Coordinates: 51.5525°N 0.1425°W

St John the Baptist, now the Christ Apostolic Church, is a grade II listed building at 23 Highgate Road, Kentish Town, London, England.

The site was originally the location of an ancient chapel-of-ease that was replaced in 1783 with a church designed by the architect James Wyatt.

That church was in turn substantially rebuilt in 1843–45 by James Hakewill, although the nave walls and apse of the original church were reused in the new one. The church became redundant in 1993 and was used for all-night raves, but more recently, it has been taken over by the Christ Apostolic Church UK and is used as a place or worship once more.

The church is on Historic England's Heritage at Risk register.
