= Done P. Dabale =

Done Peter Dabale
- Bishop
- Church: United Methodist Church in Nigeria (Christian)
- Elected: 1992

Personal details
- Born: April 26, 1949 Nyabalang-Yotti, Jereng District, Adamawa State, Middle-Belt, Nigeria
- Died: August 26, 2006 (aged 57) Houston, Texas

Done Peter Dabale (April 26, 1949 – August 26, 2006) was the founder of the United Methodist Church in Nigeria (UMCN). During the time he was a bishop, membership in the church increased from 10,000 to 400,000.

== Education ==
- 1967 Nursing Certificate, Numan School of Nursing in Adamawa, Nigeria
- 1970 Certificate in General Agriculture, Government Agriculture School in Yola Adamawa State, Nigeria
- 1974 Diploma in Theology, Theological College in Bukuru Jos, Nigeria
- 1980 International Diploma in Animal Husbandry, Barneveld College in the Netherlands
- 1980 Certificate in Church Administration, Gbarnga School of Theology in Monrovia, Liberia
- 1985 Research Certificate in Agriculture and Theology, University of Alabama, USA
- 1987 Doctor of Divinity in Theology, Gbarnga School of Theology in Monrovia, Liberia

== Personal life ==
Dabale was born in Nyabalang-Yotti of the Jereng District of Adamawa State in Nigeria. He came from a polygamous family. Dabale's mother died when he was an infant; subsequently, he was raised by one of his father's six wives. Dabale senior was a diviner (mypa) and herbalist, who according to Yotti/Bali Traditional Religion was believed to receive his wisdom from the gods and ancestors who interact with the living. Dabale was to inherit his father's leadership position; however, while a student in the city Dabale came in contact with Christians and converted. Some of Dabale's nuclear and extended family members still practice the religion of their ancestors, coexisting with newer religions of Christianity and Islam. Dabale married Kerike C. Dabale, evangelist, farmer and housewife, and they had eleven children.

He died August 26, 2006, at the Methodist Hospital. He was 57.

== Awards ==
- Nigerian National Order of Merit Award – The Vision of Africa Outstanding 2005

== Career and contributions ==
Dabale was officer in charge at the Experimental Farm Center at Numan and as a nurse Dabale served as ward assistant at Numan General Hospital, Adamawa State in Nigeria.

He held numerous secular and religious leadership positions in Nigeria, holding administrative positions and teaching classes in the areas of agriculture, and theology:

- 1974 − 76 teacher at Banyam Bible College
- 1976 − 77 teacher, the Kakulu Bible Institute
- 1977 − 82 principal, the Kakulu Bible Institute
- 1980 − 85 pastoral work in Zing
- 1980 − 86 pastoral work in Yonko, Muri East
- 1982 − 83 District Superintendent of the Muri East District (Evangelical United Brethren)

.

== See also ==
List of notable pastors in Nigeria

Christianity in Nigeria
