= Chibuzo =

- Gender: Male
- Language: Igbo

Origin
- Meaning: God is the way

Chibuzo is a masculine given name. Notable people with the name include:

- Alexander Chibuzo Ibezim (born 1962), Nigerian Anglician bishop
- Oluwaferanmi Joshua Chibuzo Oluwayemi (born 2001), English footballer

== See also ==
- Chibuzor
