= Lazarus Muoka =

Nigerian pastor, minister and author

- Born: Lazarus Muoka; Mgbidi, Imo State, Nigeria
- Occupations: clergyman; author
- Spouse: Joy Muoka

Lazarus Muoka is a Nigerian pastor, minister and author. He is the founder and General Overseer of The Lord's Chosen Charismatic Revival Movement.

== Early life and career ==
Muoka was born into a Catholic family in Umuhu-Okabia in Orsu LGA of Orlu zone in Imo State where he went on to finish his primary and secondary school education. In 1975, he moved into Lagos and worked for some time under a company before starting up his own business.

Muoka claimed to have had many dreams from God in 1994 prompting him to pull out from the church he was serving as a pastor and set up his own church. Shortly after pulling out, he set up The Lord's Chosen Charismatic Revival Movement with the aim of "preaching the undiluted word of God". The church which started with a few pioneer members has gone on to become one of the most popular churches in Nigeria.

His books include Christianity: A Better and Pure Religion

== Criticism ==
Critics have criticized the miracles performed by Lazarus Muoka as "stage-managed" and "fake". A former member of his church claimed Lazarus shortchanged him of ₦317million after making an unwritten agreement with Lazarus to invest in the church. There were also many allegations leveled against him by a woman who went on to record and sell such allegations in C.D formats in major markets in Lagos and some parts of Nigeria. The management of the church denied such allegations as "baseless" and "untrue".

== See also ==
- List of pastors in Nigeria
