= Margaret Idahosa =

Nigerian preacher, pastor, author, and archbishop

- Born: 29 July 1943 (age 83)
- Occupations: Evangelist, Preacher, Pastor and a Mother
- Known for: Preaching
- Title: Archbishop
- Spouse: Archbishop Benson Idahosa
- Children: 3 sons, 5 daughters (4 being biological and 4 being adopted)

Margaret Idahosa (born 29 July 1943) is a Nigerian preacher, author and the Archbishop of the Church of God Mission International. She is the first African female Archbishop. She is married to the late Archbishop Benson Idahosa. She is the Chancellor of Benson Idahosa University. She was conferred with the Officer of the Order of Niger (OON) by the federal government of Nigeria in 2008.

== Background ==
Margret Idahosa was born on 29 July 1943 to a royal family in Benin Kingdom of Edo State, Nigeria. She obtained a Diploma in Home Economics from Leeds Polytechnic in the United Kingdom. She obtained a master's degree in Divinity from Friends International Christian University. She also has Masters of Education degree which she acquired from Oral Roberts University, Oklahoma, USA. She was inducted into the ministry on 24 May 1983, and became a bishop on 5 April 1998. She was married to the late Archbishop Benson Idahosa, the founder of the Church of God Mission International. She is the author of The Womb of harvest, Tearing the veil, The Female minister, and Expansion without Limit. Idahosa is the first Nigerian woman to be ordained as archbishop and the first female chancellor of a university in Africa (Benson Idahosa University). She became an archbishop in November 2009.
