= Funke Kasali =

Nigerian philanthropist and Christian cleric

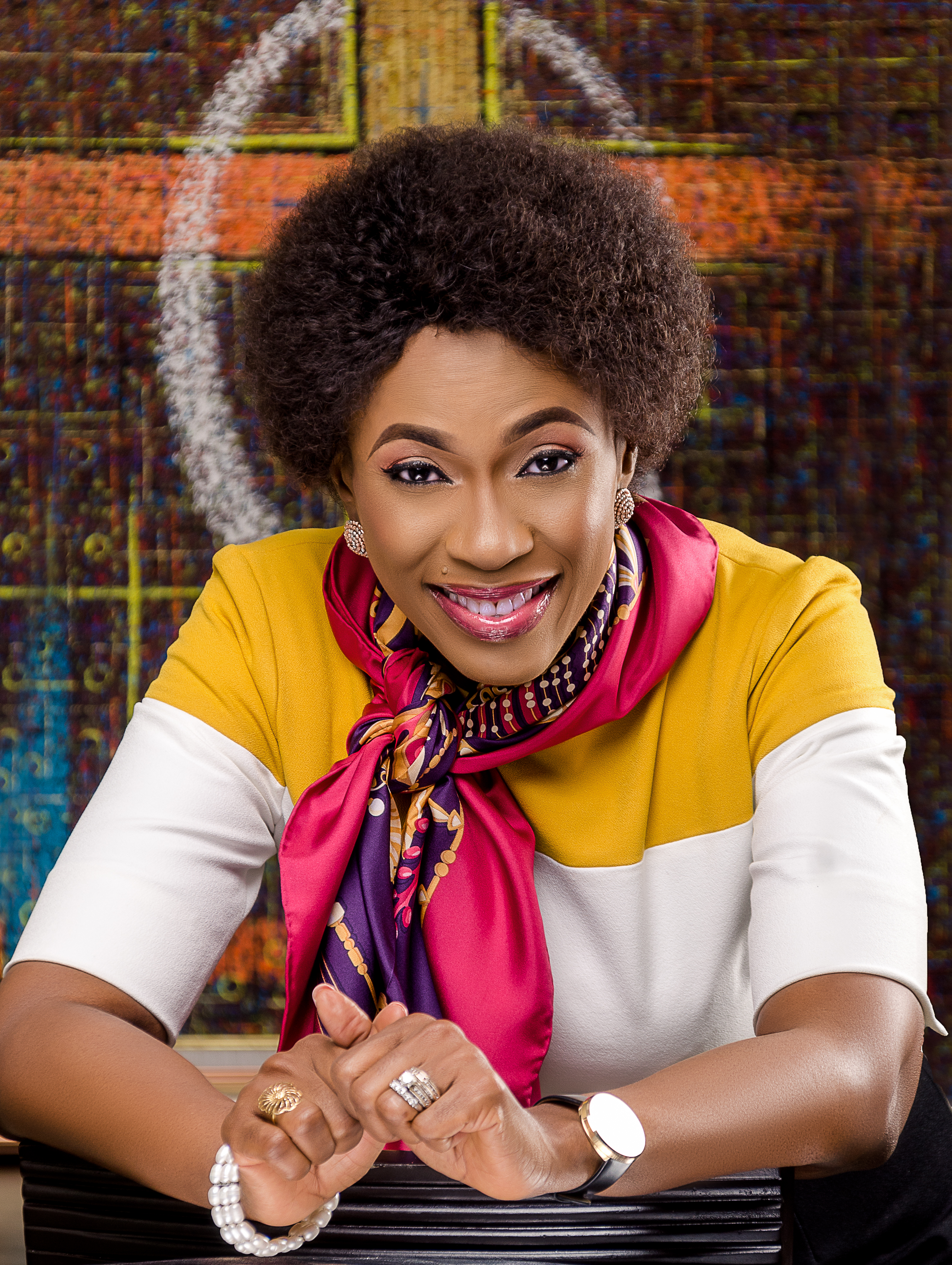
- Education: Texas Southern University, University of Houston Graduate School of Business, Institute of Chartered Accountants of Nigeria
- Occupations: Philanthropist and cleric
- Spouse: Yomi Kasali
- Children: 2

Adefunke Sharon Kasali is a Nigerian philanthropist and cleric. She was the executive secretary of the Petroleum Equalisation Fund's management board from 2007 to 2015. She is the founder of Diamond Lights Women Empowerment Initiative.

== Education and career ==
She completed a Bachelor of Business Administration degree in accounting from Texas Southern University and obtained a Master of Business Administration in Finance and MIS from the University of Houston Graduate School of Business in 1991. She is also a member of the Institute of Chartered Accountants of Nigeria (ICAN). She was appointed as the executive secretary of the Petroleum Equalization Fund Board from April 2007 to 2015.

== Personal life ==
She is married to Pastor Yomi Kasali and they have two children.
