= Sam Ochonma =

Nigerian film producer (born 1987)

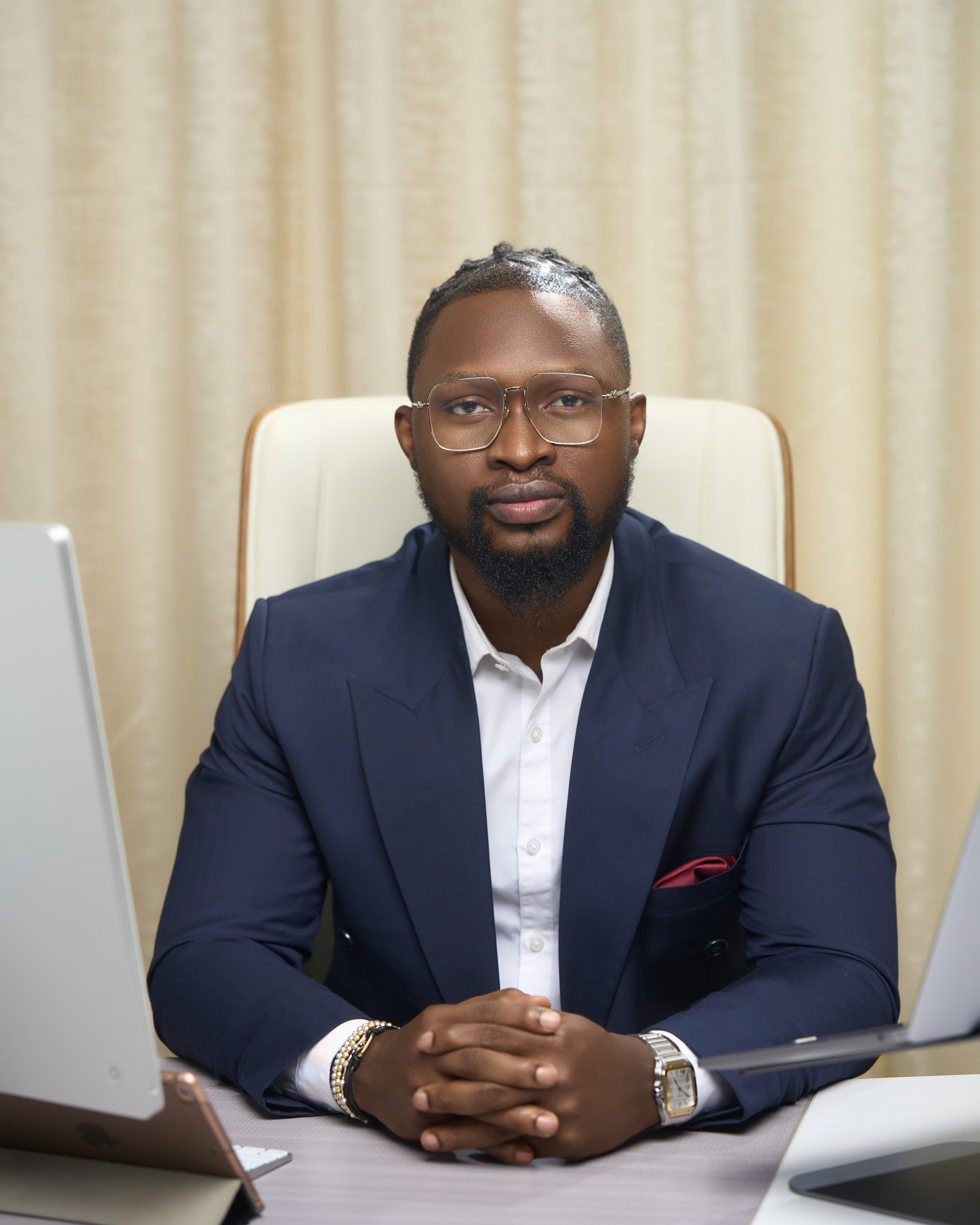
- Born: Samuel Nkem Ochonma; August 11, 1987 (age 39); Lagos, Nigeria
- Education: Benson Idahosa University
- Occupations: Advertising Executive, Film producer
- Known for: Advertising and entertainment investor
- Notable work: Kwara O to Ge, Ajosepo

Samuel Nkem Ochonma (born August 11, 1987) known professionally as Sam Ochonma is a Nigerian advertising executive, film producer & investor. His work includes television commercials, political campaigns and films. He formerly worked for Oando before he became a founding partner at The Hook Creative Agency, an advertising agency in Lagos, Nigeria, around 2018.

== Early life and education ==
Ochonma was born in Lagos, Nigeria. He attended Benson Idahosa University where he studied computer science. He also trained as a visual effects and animation artist at the SAE Institute, Cape Town.

== Career ==
After working as an animator in a small film studio in Lagos, he joined the advertising agency, Centerspread Advertising, Lagos, serving as one of the art directors on the Etisalat Nigeria account.

Ochonma then joined oil and gas company, Oando, working in their corporate communications department.

He co-founded The Hook Creative Agency in 2018 alongside three other partners, Akinwale Muse, Toheeb Balogun and Adebayo Owosina. He then became the agency's managing director.

Since then, he led The Hook's acquisition of major accounts like Meristem, Fidelity Bank, Sterling Bank, FujiFilm Instax, Airtel Nigeria and Oando.

=== Film-making ===
In 2021 Ochonma produced “Country Hard” a crime-drama that explores a day in the lives of seven strangers starring Timini Egbuson, Kehinde Bankole, Baaj Adebule and Omowunmi Dada. The film was later acquired by Amazon Prime as part of a festival showcase.

==== Ajosepo (2024) ====
Sam Ochonma collaborated with film director, Kayode Kasum, for the film “Ajosepo”. The film tells the story of a young couple who have to deal with all kinds of family tensions on the eve of their wedding. The movie earned ₦101.2 million in its first weekend.

== Filmography ==
- Country Hard (2021)
- Ajosepo (2024)
