= Elijah Abina =

Nigerian pastor (born 1935)

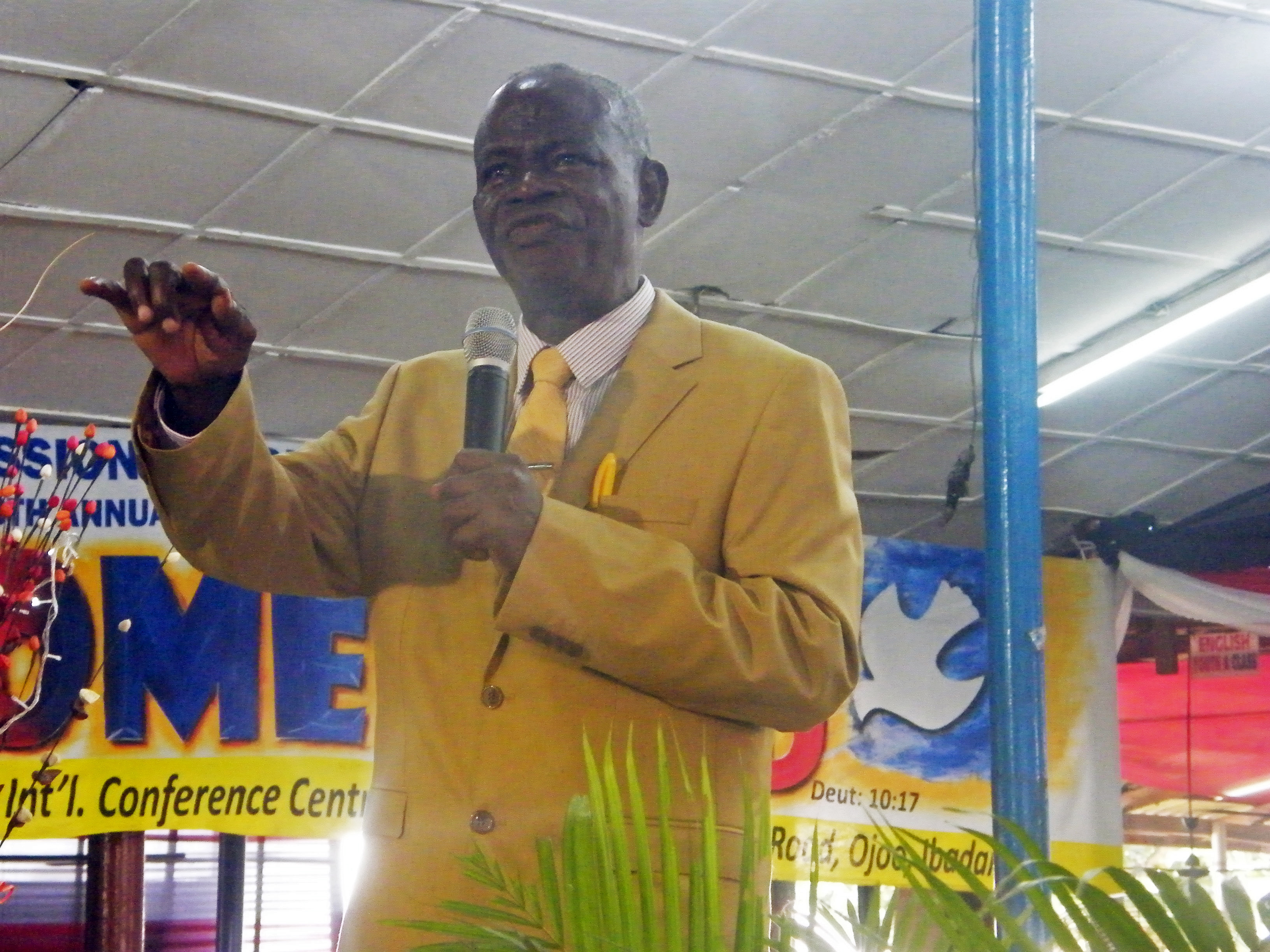
- Abina in 2013
- Born: Elijah Oludele Abina; 16 June 1935 (age 91); Aradagun, Badagry, British Nigeria (now Lagos State, Nigeria)
- Other names: Papa Abina; Pastor Abina; Daddy G.O.
- Occupation: Clergyman
- Spouse: Felicia Akinremi (m. 1961; died 2014)

Elijah Oludele Abina (born 16 June 1935) is a Nigerian pastor and the General Overseer of The Gospel Faith Mission International (GOFAMINT) and one of the founding fathers of the Pentecostal Fellowship of Nigeria (PFN).

== Early life ==
Elijah Ogundele Abina was born to Pa Abraham Akowanu Abina and Madam Omoloto Abina in Aradagun, Badagry Lagos State, Nigeria. He later changed his middle name to Oludele, renouncing his ties to idol worship. He is one of the founding members of The Gospel Faith Mission International (GOFAMINT).

Abina became a full-time minister with the Gospel Faith Mission International in October 1962, resigning from his job at Arbico Limited, Apapa Lagos. He was first, the pastor-in-charge of the GOFAMINT Iwaya Church in 1963, then pastor-in-charge of the GOFAMINT Mushin church in 1966 and later promoted to become the District Overseer. Reuben George, the then General Overseer later appointed him as his deputy, a position he served in until George died in 1987. Abina then assumed the leadership of the church after a unanimous agreement by the members of the Church's Executive Council. He was installed on January 8, 1988, at the GOFAMINT International Gospel Centre, Ojoo, Ibadan, Oyo State.

== Personal life ==
Abina married Felicia Abina (née Akinremi) on 30 March 1961. Together, they have six children. His wife died in June 2014, and his first son died in April 2021.
