= Adeola Emmanuel Abolaji =

Nigerian actor, filmmaker, and politician

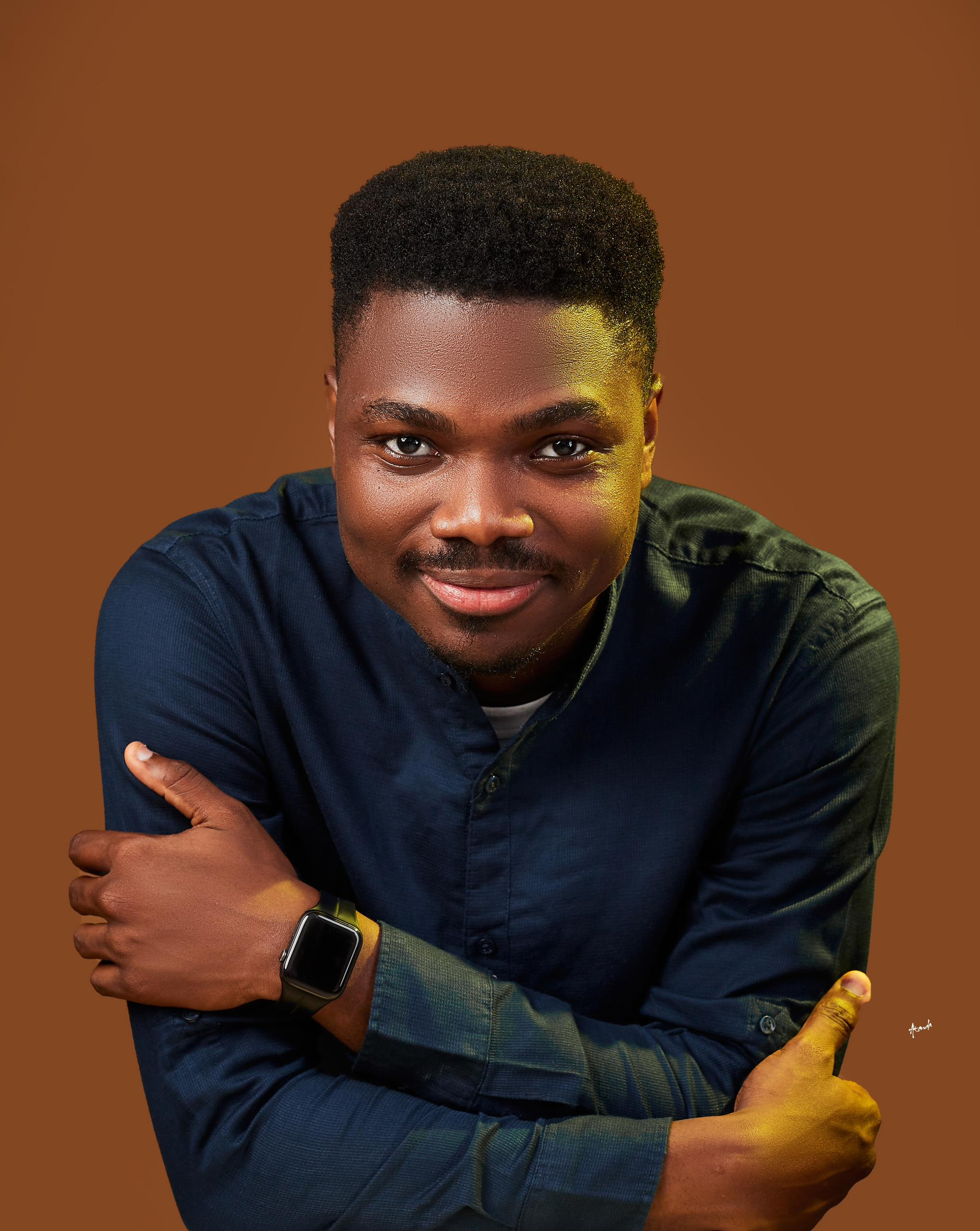
- Born: 11 November 1993 (age 32)
- Education: Babcock University
- Occupations: Actor, Pastor, Media Consultant
- Employer: Redeemed Christian Church of God
- Website: https://abolajiadeola.com/

Adeola Emmanuel Abolaji (born 11 November 1993) is a Nigerian actor, filmmaker, pastor, media entrepreneur, and political representative. He is also the Lead Pastor of RCCG Living Seed Church Omole and the music band, Spirit Of Prophecy.

== Early life and career ==
He is a graduate of biochemistry from Babcock University, with an MBA from Redeemers' University. He is the Head of Digital Communications in the Office of the Principal Executive Assistant to the General Overseer of RCCG.

== Career ==
In 2017, Abolaji founded Expert Beam Media, a pan-African media firm offering media-related services across video production, advertising,and social media. Among major brands he has worked with are the BBC, Premium Trust Bank, and Opera News. He also held advisory positions as part of Makkan Innovation's strategic team for real estate technology initiative.

=== Film and Acting ===
Abolaji portrayed Pastor E. A. Adeboye in the biographical film Enoch (2023), produced by Mount Zion Films and Solid Rock Foundation. He also featured in Ayaba and Trampled (Parts 1-3) a film series produced by Solid Rock Foundation

=== Awards ===
On 6 August 2023, Abolaji was named an ECOWAS Youth Ambassador and received the Nelson Mandela Leadership Award in recognition of his philanthropic contributions in education, healthcare, and socio-cultural development

=== Politics ===
Abolaji serves as the Deputy Speaker of the Legislative House and Councillor representing Ofada Ward in Obafemi Owode LGA, Ogun State.

== Personal life ==
He is married to Moromoluwatiketike Abolaji and they have a son, Jubilee Abolaji and a daughter.

== Filmography ==
Year	Film	Role	Character	Ref
2023	Enoch	Main Actor	Adeboye Adejare	
2024	Trampled			
2025	Ayaba			
