= Uma Ukpai =

Nigerian preacher (1945–2025)

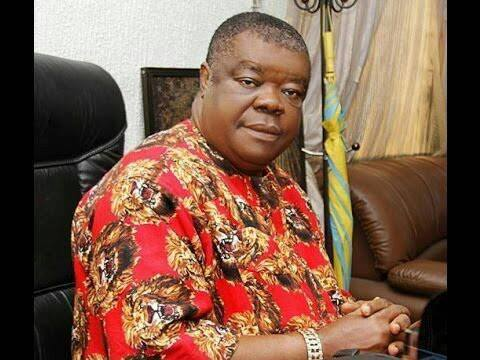

Personal details
- Born: 7 January 1945 Asaga, Ohafia, Colony and Protectorate of Nigeria
- Died: 6 October 2025 (aged 80)
- Residence: Uyo, Akwa Ibom, Nigeria
- Spouse: Philomena Uma Ukpai (m. 1975).
- Occupation: Christian preacher and evangelist
- Website: www.drumaukpai.org

Uma Ukpai (7 January 1945 – 6 October 2025) was a Nigerian Christian leader, international evangelist and preacher. He was the founder and president of Uma Ukpai Evangelistic Association (UUEA), a non-denominational gospel ministry based in Uyo, Akwa Ibom State, Nigeria. He was also a key leader of Pentecostal Fellowship of Nigeria, PFN, being a founder of the movement.

== Early life and education ==
An Igbo man from Asaga in Ohafia, Abia State, Ukpai converted to Christianity in 1958. His father died when Ukpai was age 10. Uma Ukpai describing how his early life challenges nearly impaired his career development remarked “I know what it means to lose a father and be a father from that age. I know what it is to save money to pay school fees. So, I have feelings for the poor. I learnt early enough to know that the stone Satan throws at you can become a stepping stone.”

Ukpai attended Uma Ukpai Memorial Primary School, Asaga, and Khana County Council School, Ogoni. Uma passed through All Saints Secondary School, Aba, and Niger Delta Technical School, now Boys Technical College, Aba. Uma Ukpai graduated from the School of Journalism and Television, Frisham, Hermitage, United Kingdom; South Florida Christian College Miami, Florida, USA; Carolina Christian University and Burke Bible College, Kentucky, USA. He held a Certificate in Electrical Engineering Practice, a Diploma in Journalism, a Bachelor and Doctorate Degrees in Divinity.

== Ministry ==
Ukpai was called to build bridges between different denominations through his evangelistic, prophetic and crusade ministry. For more than 30 years, the ministry has run a medical outreach whilst doing the work of God. Uma Ukpai Evangelistic Association, UUEA, is one of the financiers of Pentecostal Fellowship of Nigeria, (PFN).

=== Crusades ===
Ukpai held many citywide crusades all over Nigeria. He held a yearly crusade, Greater Ohafia For Christ Crusade, and in collaboration with Dr Celestine Iwendi - a lecturer and the Pastor in charge at The Comfort Zone Ministries, Uma held Anioma One-million Man Crusade, 2016, where a lot of miracles took place, healing and deliverance as such too Nsukka 2012, and Greater Ibadan for Christ 1982. It was his Greater Lagos for Christ Crusade of 1985 that gave birth to the Pentecostal Fellowship of Nigeria (PFN).

=== Medical outreach ===
Ukpai was the chairman of Uma Ukpai Eye Centre, and King of Kings Hospital, a specialist hospital in Abia State, that services communities in Abia, Akwa Ibom and Cross River States.

=== Academic institutions ===
Ukpai was the proprietor of Uma Ukpai School of Theology and Biblical Studies, Uyo, Uma Ukpai Polytechnic Asaga, Uma Ukpai Scholarship Foundation and Joseph business school, affiliate of Joseph business school Chicago, USA.

== Personal life and death ==
Ukpai was married to Philomena, a pastor. Their marriage produced eight children and an adopted child. Ukpai lost two of his children in a car collision on the same day.

Ukpai died on 6 October 2025, at the age of 80.
