= Pa Elton =

Sydney Granville Elton
- Church: The Apostolic Church of Nigeria

Personal details
- Born: Sydney Granville Elton; 16 April 1907 England, United Kingdom
- Died: 16 January 1987 (aged 79) Ilesa, Osun State, Nigeria
- Spouse: Hannah Elton
- Children: Ruth Elton
- Occupation: Missionary, Evangelist, Church planter

Pa Sydney Granville Elton (16 April 1907 – 16 January 1987), popularly known as Pa Elton, was a British-born Nigerian Christian missionary regarded as one of the pioneers of the Pentecostal revival movement in Nigeria.
