= Salvation Ministries =

Nigerian Pentecostal megachurch

- Salvation Ministries
- Country: Nigeria
- Denomination: Pentecostal
- Churchmanship: Charismatic

History
- Founded: 13 April 1997
- Founder: David Ibiyeomie

Salvation Ministries is a Nigerian Pentecostal Christian megachurch headquartered in Port Harcourt, Rivers State, Nigeria. It was founded by Pastor David Ibiyeomie on 13 April 1997.

== History ==
The church began with 34 attendees in a small building located in Port Harcourt. It experienced rapid growth and now operates thousands of satellite churches within Nigeria and abroad. In February 2011, Salvation Ministries launched 14 satellite churches in one day, each running five services.

== Beliefs and activities ==
Salvation Ministries follows Pentecostal doctrines, emphasizing salvation through Jesus Christ, the power of the Holy Spirit, healing, prosperity, and evangelism. The church organizes major annual events such as 5 Nights of Glory, Glory Reign, and Easter/Christmas services broadcast globally.

Its media arm broadcasts the weekly Hour of Salvation program on various Nigerian and international TV channels.

== See also ==
- David Ibiyeomie
- List of churches in Nigeria
- Christianity in Nigeria
