= S.O. Oladele =

Pastor and televangelist

Pastor S.O. Oladele
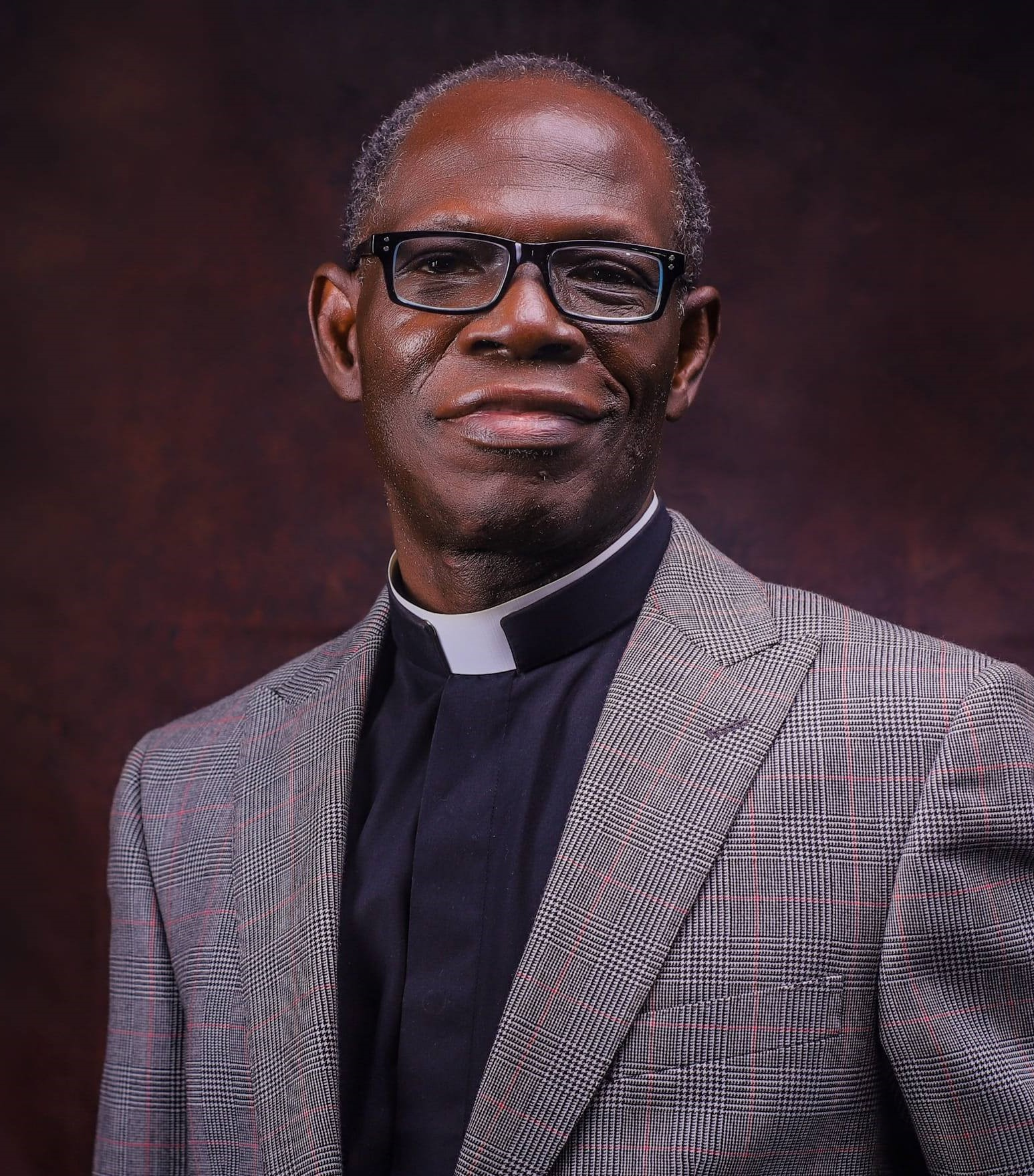
- Pastor S. O Oladele
- Born: Samuel Olusegun Oladele; 30 August 1955 (age 70); Alagbagba, Southern Region, British Nigeria (now in Ogun State, Nigeria)
- Education: CAC Bible Training School, Akure International Bible Training Institute, West Sussex
- Occupations: Pastor, author, televangelist
- Employer: Christ Apostolic Church
- Predecessor: A.O Akinosun

Samuel Olusegun Oladele (born 30 August 1955) is the 8th President of Christ Apostolic Church. He was inaugurated in 2021.

== Ministry ==
He started ministry at the age of 14 and attended CAC Bible Training School (now CAC Theological Seminary) and graduated in 1974. He was employed to work as a tutor at CAC Bible Training School until 1977 when He travelled to the United Kingdom where he attended the International Bible Training Institute, West Sussex. He returned to Nigeria in 1980.

He worked as an Assembly Pastor, promoted to a district superintendent, Chairman Of CAC Oke-Ado Dcc, then promoted to the post of General Supridentent of Christ Apostolic Church till 2020 when he was appointed as President of Christ Apostolic Church.

== Appointment ==
Pastor Samuel Oladele was appointed as President of Christ Apostolic Church in October 2020 by the General Council of the Church. His Inauguration was held on 20 March 2021 at the general secretariat of the church, CAC All Saints Chapel.
