= Foluke Adeboye (Mummy G.O.) =

Nigerian televangelist (born 1948)

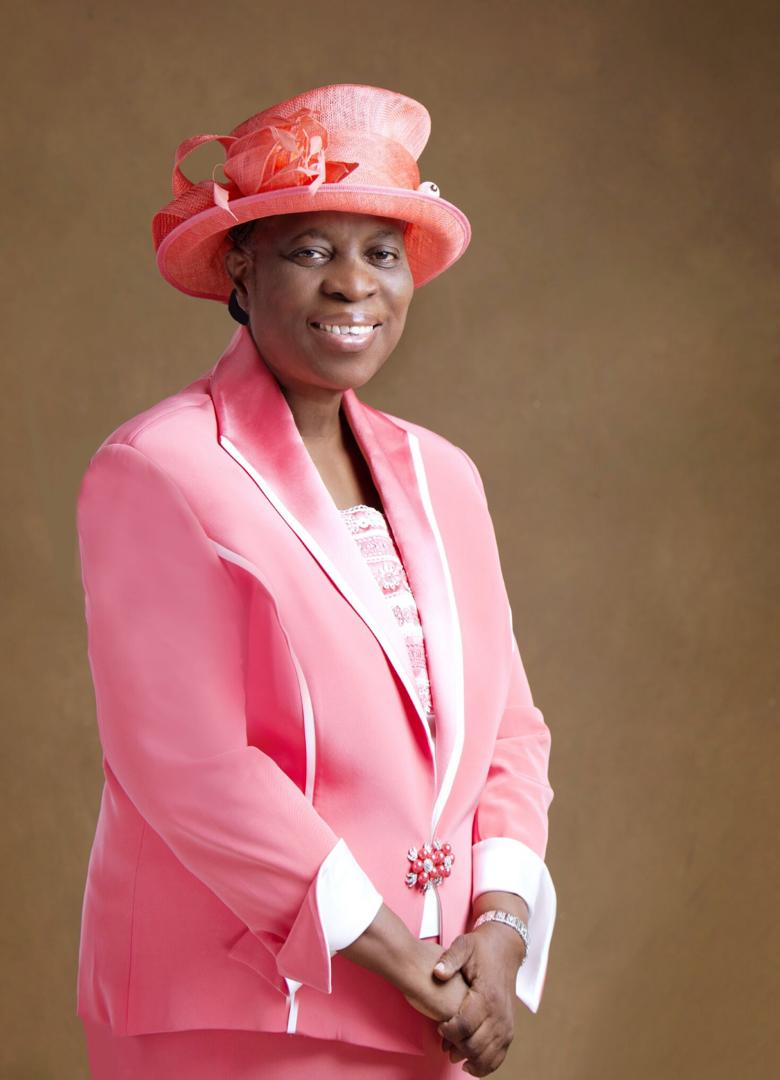
- Image of Foluke Adeboye
- Born: Foluke Adenike Adeyokunnu; 13 July 1948 (age 78); Ijesha, Southern Region, British Nigeria (now Ijesha, Osun State, Nigeria)
- Spouse: Enoch Adeboye
- Website: Official website

Foluke Adenike Adeboye (née Adeyokunnu; born 13 July 1948) also known as Mummy G.O. is a pastor, televangelist, conference speaker, author and wife of Enoch Adeboye, the General Overseer of the Redeemed Christian Church of God.

== Early life ==
Foluke Adeboye was born Foluke Adenike Adeyokunnu on 13 July 1948 to the family of Jacob Adelusi Adeyokunnu, a prince of the royal family of Owa Obokun Oji in Ijeshaland, Osun State, Nigeria. Not only was her father of royal lineage, he was also a teacher in the Methodist mission and a Catechist. She is the eldest of six daughters and four sons born to that family.

== Education ==
She attended Methodist Primary School-Oke Eshe- Ilesha and Methodist Girls School- Agurodo-Ilesha before obtaining a grade II teacher's certificate from United Missionary College, Ibadan, and a diploma in education (science and mathematics) at the College of Education, University of Lagos.

On 17 July 2022, she got an honorary doctorate degree in education from the Benson Idahosa University, Benin, Edo State.
