= Benson Idahosa University =

Private university in Nigeria

- BIU
- Type: Private
- Established: February 2002
- Affiliations: Church of God Mission International (CGMi)
- Chancellor: Archbishop Margaret Benson Idahosa OON
- Vice-Chancellor: Prof. John Aroye Okhuoya
- Location: Benin, Edo State, Nigeria; 6°20′N 5°38′E
- Campus: Urban, Multiples sites
- Colors: Royal blue, gold and white
- Website: biu.edu.ng

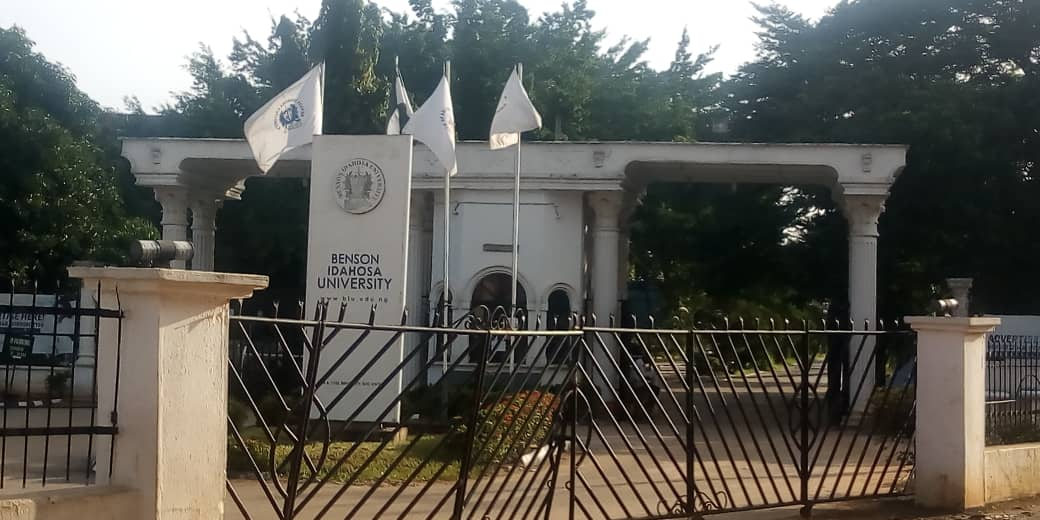
Benson Idahosa University

Benson Idahosa University (BIU) is a private, Christian university in Benin City, Edo State, Nigeria.

Previously named Christian Faith University (CFU), it was renamed in honor of Archbishop Benson Idahosa, a Charismatic Pentecostal minister from Benin City, Nigeria, and reflects his evangelical beliefs. He was the first president of the university. The current president of Benson Idahosa University, Rt. Rev. (Dr.) Faith Emmanuel Benson Idahosa, son of Benson Idahosa, is the Bishop of CGMi Faith Arena and Co-ordinator, Next Generation Leadership of the Church of God Mission.

BIU is accredited by Nigeria's higher education accreditation body, the National Universities Commission (NUC).

== History ==
At the dedication of the multi-purpose main auditorium, the founder, Archbishop Benson Andrew Idahosa, said "in 1978, God told me I was going to build a university to the glory of his majesty... only God could have done that, as building a university in Nigeria then was the preserve of Federal and State Governments in Nigeria."

The university commenced its academic programmes as Christian Faith University-Institute of Continuous Learning in 1993 at the Ugbor Campus. Successful candidates were admitted into two faculties—Basic Sciences and Management Sciences. National diploma degrees were awarded to students on completion of a two-year programme in affiliation with University of Benin, Benin City and Edo State University, Ekpoma (now Ambrose Alli University, Edo State).

The head of management was referred to as the rector. The rector was Prof. Uche Gbenedio. With support from Mike Okagbare, the registrar, and Mr. Adams, the bursar. Candidates were admitted into programmes in Computer Science, Computer Technology, Agriculture, Accounting, Economics and Political Science.

The university was later named "Benson Idahosa University" in 1998. In the 1999/2000 academic session, BIU had three faculties—Faculty of Basic and Applied Sciences, Faculty of Social and Management Sciences and Faculty of Arts and Education.

The university received the required license to operate as a private university in Nigeria from the National Universities Commission in February 2002.

The university's fourth faculty is the Faculty of Law, which currently has provisional accreditation from the Council of Legal Education.

In August 2015, BIU opened its second campus, popularly known as Legacy Campus, Okha, with the movement of Faculty of Agriculture and Agricultural Technologies in August 2015, and commencement of Faculty of Engineering in September 2015. Prof. Ben Anyata became the First Dean, Faculty of Engineering in February 2015.

In June 2025, the National Universities Commission (NUC) granted full accreditation to eleven programmes and interim accreditation to two programmes at Benson Idahosa University, following its October/November 2024 accreditation exercise. Notable programmes that received full accreditation include Medicine and Surgery (MBBS), Law, Mass Communication, and Agriculture, alongside several Basic Sciences courses (Biochemistry, Microbiology, Industrial Chemistry, Computer Science). Business Administration and Accounting received interim accreditation. These results were announced by the Vice-Chancellor, Professor Sam Guobadia.

== Alumni ==
=== Notable alumni ===
Among notable alumni are:

- Foluke Adeboye, author, televangelist
- Eghosa Asemota Agbonifo, entrepreneur, politician
- Blossom Chukwujekwu, Nollywood actor
- Uti Nwachukwu, TV presenter
- Sam Ochonma, business executive
- Real Warri Pikin, comedienne and actress

=== Association ===
Benson Idahosa University alumni comprise graduates of the then Christian Faith University, which later translated into Benson Idahosa University. Alumni groups and chapters have been organized in several states with a view to carrying on the traditions of BIU and strengthening ties and communication between alumni and the university. The association has been in existence since 2004.
