= Eghosa Asemota Agbonifo =

Nigerian politician and businessman

- Born: June 19, 1985 (age 41); Benin City, Edo
- Education: Paris School of Business
- Occupation: Entrepreneur
- Years active: 2008 - Present
- Organization: Michael Agbonifo "Shoe a child" foundation
- Spouse: Oshiolene Agbonifo
- Children: Osamagbe, Osazemen and Eghosasere Michael
- Website: http://www.eteknotions.com/

Eghosa Asemota Agbonifo, also known as Etek Notions, is a Nigerian businessman and serial entrepreneur from Benin City.

== Education ==
Eghosa was educated at Emotan Primary School, Benin City from 1991-1997. He later proceeded to Negbenebor International School for his secondary education between 1997- 2003. He received a bachelor's degree in Computer Science from Benson Idahosa University between 2009-2014. He obtained a master's degree in Luxury and Fashion Management from the prestigious Paris School of Business in Paris, France.

== Business career ==
Etek Luxury was established as a luxury firm in 2008 in Benin, Edo State, Nigeria. Today, its operations have expanded to Lagos, and other cities. Etek as a brand has also expanded into real estate, automobile, and luxury. Etek Luxury dominates the luxurious market in Nigeria and is a major seller of top global brands like Gucci, Versace, Louis Vuitton, Prada, Chanel, Fendi, Dior, Nike, Burberry, Hermes, Armani, Dolce & Gabbana, Valentino, Balenciaga, Ralph Lauren, Saint Laurent, Givenchy, Zara, Calvin Klein and a host of others.

Etek as a global brand has diversified into real estate and has sold, rented, and leased out quality properties to clients.

Agbonifo is the Chief Executive Officer of Etek Global Resources.

== Philanthropy ==
Agbonifo helped found the Michael Agbonifo Foundation, which has impacted the lives of people, especially in Oredo West Local Government and Edo State, by providing food, shoes, empowerment to people. He has been described as a philanthropist whose charity has touched lives.

== Political career ==
In 2019, Eghosa contested for the Oredo West Constituency seat in the Edo State House of Assembly under the umbrella of People’s Democratic Party (PDP) as its flag bearer and emerged second in the main election. He is still active in politics in Edo state.

== Personal life ==
Agbonifo lives in Benin, Edo State but frequently shuttles between there and Lagos. He is married to Oshiolene (Gladys) Agbonifo and have three children; two daughters and a son. He is also an avid enthusiast of Chelsea Football Club in London, United Kingdom.

== Awards and membership ==
Agbonifo is a member of Lions Club International, Benin Club, and the National Association of Seadogs Pyrate Confraternity.

He was awarded as one of the top 20 fashionistas in Nigeria.
