= Yomi Kasali =

Nigerian minister (born 1963)

- Born: Abayomi Matthew Kasali; 28 February 1963 (age 63)
- Occupations: Teacher, author
- Website: yomikasali.com

Abayomi Matthew Kasali (born 28 February 1963) is a Nigerian minister. He is the founder and senior pastor of the Foundation of Truth Assembly headquartered in Lagos, Nigeria. Kasali is the founder of the non-governmental organisation 5 Loaves 2 Fishes.

== Career ==
Kasali is the senior pastor of Foundation of Truth Assembly headquartered in Lagos with branches in Abuja and Houston. He founded a humanitarian outreach; 5 Loaves 2 Fishes aimed at feeding the less privileged, providing clothing and medi-care to the less privileged in the society. His telecast, Impact Today airs on Silverbird Television.

Kasali is the President of Berean Ministers Group and secretary of the Nigerian Coalition of Apostolic Leaders (NCAL), an affiliate of International Coalition of Apostolic Leaders (ICAL). He is also the current chairman of the Nigerian Pilgrims Commission and a member of the governing council of the University of Lagos.

== Personal life ==
Kasali is married to Pastor Sharon Adefunke Kasali and they have two children.
