= Christ Apostolic Church =

First Aladura Pentecostal church in Nigeria

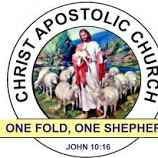
- Abbreviation: CAC
- Classification: Protestant
- Orientation: Pentecostal; African-initiated; Charismatic
- Theology: Aladura
- Governance: Pastors
- President: Pastor S.O Oladele
- General Evangelist: Prophet Hezekiah Oladeji
- General Superintendent: Pastor E.O Odejobi
- Associations: Christian Association of Nigeria, Pentecostal Fellowship of Nigeria
- Region: Nigeria and overseas
- Headquarters: General Secretariat: Oba I.B Akinyele Memorial Complex, Bashorun, Ibadan, Nigeria. International Camp Ground: Joseph Ayo Babalola International Miracle Camp, Ilesa-Akure Expressway, Ikeji-Arakeji, Osun State, Nigeria
- Founder: Oba/Pastor Isaac Babalola Akinyele, Pastor David O. Odubanjo, Apostle Joseph Ayo Babalola
- Origin: 1918; Ijebu Ode
- Separated from: The Apostolic Church Nigeria
- Tertiary institutions: Joseph Ayo Babalola University
- Seminaries: Christ Apostolic Church Theological Seminary Ile-Ife
- Official website: cacworld.org
- Slogan: ONE FOLD, ONE SHEPHERD

Christ Apostolic Church (CAC) is the first Pentecostal church present in Nigeria. It arose in the first half of the 20th century, in the then-British Empire. It was founded in Ijebu-ode named Precious Stone Society in 1918 but was formally established in 1941 after a split from the Apostolic Church which the original Aladura organization (Faith Tabernacle) had invited to Nigeria. Its growth was led by Joseph Ayo Babalola, a road construction driver who became its first General Evangelist.

Christ Apostolic Church operates secondary schools and an Entrepreneurial University named after the first General Evangelist, Joseph Ayo Babalola University (JABU) right in Ikeji Arakeji, Osun State in Nigeria. Pastor Samuel Olusegun Oladele was inaugurated as the 8th president of Christ Apostolic Church Worldwide on 20 March 2021.

== History ==
Christ Apostolic Church is an indigenous African church founded by members of Precious Stone Society (Faith Tabernacle) after separating from The Apostolic Church in 1940. The church's history is linked to its founders, namely Isaac Babalola Akinyele, Joseph Ayo Babalola, David Odubanjo, Joseph Esinsinade, and Miss Sophia Odunlami.

Before then, Christ Apostolic Church and The Apostolic Church (called Diamond or Precious Stone at that time) were found in some places in Nigeria but met mainly at St Savior's Anglican Church. The Anglican Church were opposed to the practices of the group and members of the group who are workers in the Anglican Church were forced to resign. When the Great Revival emerged in July 1930 people rejected their traditional medicines and thousands of people gave their lives to Jesus. On 23 September 1931, Pastors D.P Williams, A. Turnbull, and W.J Williams came to Nigeria and ordained the first seven Pastors of the church. Then during the crisis that occurred in 1939–1940 in the church that led to the emergence of two groups, the first is The Apostolic Church Nigeria led by Pastor Samuel Adegboyega while the second is Christ Apostolic Church.

Baba Abiye was one of the leaders of the Christ Apostolic Church who served as the Assistant General Evangelist of the church, working closely with Joseph Ayo Babalola during his lifetime.

== Tenets ==
Christ Apostolic Church adopted the 11 tenets of the Apostolic Church UK and added the 12th and 13th tenets in 1940.

== Leadership ==
- Pastor Isaac Babalola Akinyele (1943–1964) – served as the first president from incorporation until 1964.
- Pastor Jacob Soyege Bartholomew Odusona (1964–1966) – succeeded Akinyele and led for two years.
- Pastor Elijah Titus Latunde (1966–1983) – presided over the church for 17 years. Prior to his presidency, he had served as vice president under Odusona.
- Pastor John Dada Obafemi – one of the only two leaders who became president without previously serving as General Superintendent.
- Pastor Joseph Bolade Orogun (1983–1991) – succeeded Latunde. He retired following the General Executive Council's policy on age-based retirement. An interim administration headed by Pastor E.A. Faniyan was in place between 1991 and June 1993.
- Pastor John Dada Obafemi (1993–1997) – appointed president in 1993 and retired in 1997.
- Pastor Elijah Howard Lajuwomi Olusheye (1997–2011) – succeeded Obafemi and served until December 2011.
- Pastor Abraham Olukunle Akinosun (2012–2020) – became president in 2012 and held office until 2020
- Pastor Samuel Olusegun Oladele (2021–present) – the incumbent president, having assumed office in 2021 till date

== See also ==
- Nigerian sectarian violence
- Church of the Lord (Aladura)
- Celestial Church of Christ
- Eternal Sacred Order of Cherubim and Seraphim
- Cherubim and Seraphim Society
- New religious movement
- St John the Baptist, Kentish Town
- Redeemed Christian Church of God
- Living Faith Church Worldwide
- Deeper Christian Life Ministry
- Anglican Adam Preaching Society
- Cornelius Adam Igbudu
- Onyeka Onwenu
- Junior Pope
