= Joseph Ayo Babalola University =

Private university in Ikeji-Arakeji, Nigeria

- Other name: JABU
- Motto: For knowledge and godly service.
- Type: Private
- Established: 2004
- Visitor: Pastor S.O Oladele
- Chancellor: Professor A.O. Adegbulugbe
- Vice-Chancellor: Professor O.A. Fakolujo
- Students: 4000+
- Location: Ipo Arakeji and Ikeji-Arakeji, Osun State, Nigeria; 7°24′58″N 4°58′08″E
- Colors: Blue, green, red & yellow
- Website: jabu.edu.ng

The Joseph Ayo Babalola University (JABU) is a private Nigerian university located in Ipo Arakeji and Ikeji-Arakeji, Osun State, Nigeria, established in 2004 by the Christ Apostolic Church (CAC) Worldwide.

The university is named after the first spiritual leader of the Christ Apostolic Church, Joseph Ayo Babalola (1904–1959).

== Administration ==
=== Chancellor ===
- Professor A.O. Adegbulugbe – Chancellor (appointed 2023, serving to present), providing ceremonial leadership and representing the university at formal events.

=== Vice-Chancellors ===
Vice-Chancellor	Tenure	Prof. O.A. Fakolujo	2022–present

== Acreditation ==
Joseph Ayo Babalola University is accredited by the National Universities Commission (NUC) of Nigeria.
