= Sam Guobadia =

Nigerian professor and educational administrator

Professor Sam Guobadia
- Born: Benin
- Occupations: Academic; Educational administrator
- Employer: Benson Idahosa University

Sam Guobadia is a Nigerian professor of economics and educational administrator who is the sixth substantive Vice Chancellor of Benson Idahosa University.
