= Chibuzor Gift Chinyere =

Nigerian pastor and televangelist (born 1973)

Apostle Chibuzor Gift Chinyere
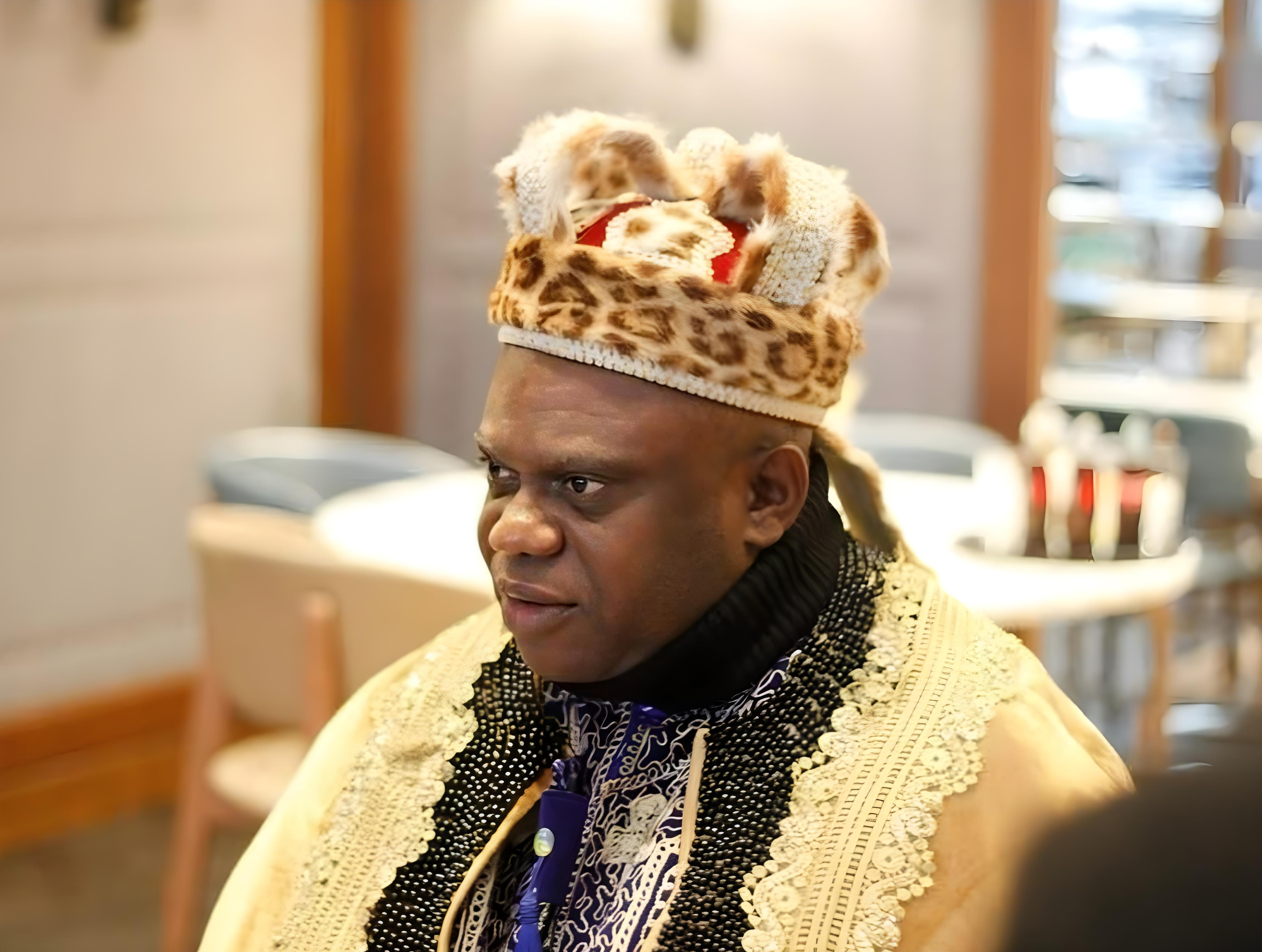
- Born: Chibuzor Gift Chinyere; October 22, 1973 (age 52); Abia State, Nigeria
- Occupation: Pastor
- Spouse: Nkechi Juliet Chinyere
- Children: 1

Apostle Chibuzor Gift Chinyere (born October 22, 1973) is a Nigerian pastor and televangelist who is the founder of Omega Power Ministries (OPM).

He was awarded by the Nigerian Books of Record for 2019 and was inducted into the Nigerian Books of Records Hall of Fame and also decorated with Fellowship Award by the Supreme Council, Nigerian Books of Record Research Centre, Abuja. He is the first Black man to receive gold medal humanitarian award and also the first to build school of autism in Nigeria.

In 2024, He became the first General Overseer to ascend the throne as King, when he was presented a staff of office by Abia State Governor, Alex Otti as the traditional ruler of Ikwu Orie Ohanku Ndoki Autonomous Community in Ukwa East LGA.

== Early life and education ==
Apostle Chibuzor Gift Chinyere was born on 22 October 1973, in Rivers State. He hails from Ukwa East Local Government Area in Abia State. He went to Seabed Nursery Army Children School, before proceeding to Government Technical College for his secondary education.

== Ministry ==
Chibuzor is the General Overseer and founder of Omega Power Ministries (OPM). He sponsors more than 3000 young people on scholarships including the controversial Happy boys in Europe, Asia, North America and other parts of the world.

Chibuzor has contributed to the reduction in the high rate of maternal mortality in Nigeria through his Free Specialist Hospitals and has also helped sex workers.

He built a multi-free skills acquisition center in Port Harcourt and has contributed to curbing insecurity in River State by building a rehabilitation center.

In 2022, he stepped down for the Labour Party (Nigeria) presidential candidate Peter Obi to emerge the Igbere Television 2020 Man of the Year award.

== Controversy ==
In 2021, he helped two Nigerian boys called Happie Boys by offering a scholarship to them in Cyprus, who were fired from working at a Chicken Republic. In 2023 he was alleged to have abandoned them with rumors that the incident contributed to him collapsing at the airport.

In 2023, he was accused by a 22-year-old woman of an extramarital affair; allegations he denied.

== Personal life ==
He is married to Nkechi Juliet Chinyere and they have a daughter.

== Awards ==
- Humanitarian Champion award by International Association of World Peace Advocates.
- Nigerian Books of Record
- Humanitarian Service Icon Award 2022 by The Sun (Nigeria).
- Crusader of Social Gospel" by Uniport's Department of Religious and Cultural Studies.
- Humanitarian Man of the Year Award' by Igbere TV.
- Navy Ship Golden ICON Award by the Nigerian Navy Ship.
- 2023 Most Outstanding Man Of God Of The Year' Award by Igbere TV.
- Humanity and society BY Nigeria Union of Journalists
- Icon of Free Education Award by National Union of Nigerian Students (NANS)
- 2023 Time Africa Magazine 100 Change Makers – Most Inspiring People in Africa.

== See also ==
- List of people from Rivers State
- List of pastors in Nigeria
