= Stella Foluke Osafile =

Nigerian politician

Stella Foluke Osafile is a Nigerian politician. She currently serves as the State Representatives representing Amuwo Odofin constituency at the Lagos State House of Assembly.
