= The Gospel Faith Mission International =

Nigerian Christian denomination

The Gospel Faith Mission International (GOFAMINT)
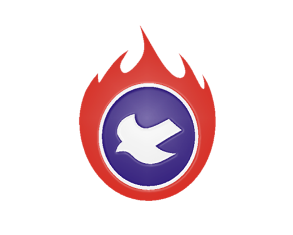
- GOFAMINT Logo
- Classification: Protestant
- Theology: Pentecostal
- Governance: Pastor Dr. Elijah Oludele Abina, General Overseer (1987 till date)
- Region: Worldwide
- Founder: Rev. Dr. Reuben Akinwalere George
- Origin: 1956 Lagos, Nigeria; Iwaya
- Separated from: Christ Apostolic Church
- Official website: http://www.gofamint.org

The Gospel Faith Mission International (GOFAMINT) is a Christian denomination from Nigeria founded by Reuben Akinwalere George in Iwaya Yaba circa 1955.

The Gospel Faith Mission International is present in numerous countries, such as Britain since 1983 and the United States since 1985.

GOFAMINT's International Office is situated at Gospel City; Kilometer 40, Lagos/Ibadan Expressway, Aseese, Ogun State. The National Office is at International Gospel Centre, Ojoo, Oyo Road, Ibadan, Oyo State.

== History ==
It all began with Brother Reuben Akinwalere George (later Pastor (Dr) R. A. George), a member of the Christ Apostolic Church (CAC) and a leader of the Christ Army Band of the CAC. In 1956, they started first as a small fellowship and Bible Study Group led by George at his residence. The Church began to grow, and later moved to her first building and gradually spread. George was ordained as Pastor in 1959 and he died in 1987 after which his deputy Pastor (Dr) E.O. Abina took over the mantle of leadership. Pastor Elijah Ogundele Abina resigned his appointment in the secular work at Arbico Ltd. Apapa Lagos and took up pastoral duty as Pastor i/c of G.F.M. from Saturday 29 September 1962. On 22 December 1963, Pastor E.O. Abina was ordained as Pastor. The Gospel Faith Mission International became an incorporated body in Nigeria in October 1967. The first Annual Convention was held from 4 to 7 November 1966. Attendance then was 300 and there was free feeding for participants.

Today the church has over 2000 branches under over 19 administrative regions headed by Regional Pastors. The Regions are further sub-divided into Districts and Areas which are equally headed by District and Area pastors respectively. GOFAMINT, as popularly called, currently exists in the following eight Anglophone African countries: Nigeria, Egypt, Sierra Leone, Liberia, Ghana, Kenya, Botswana and South Africa. While also existing in the following seven Francophone African countries: Benin Republic, Cote D'Ivoire, Burkina Faso, Togo, Niger, Cameroon and Gabon.

The church had early entrance to Britain, which was established in 1983 and had since extended to the Irish Republic with a branch in Dublin, and to France and Belgium. GOFAMINT's first branch in Washington DC commenced with only four members in 1984. The church now has several branches in the United States in well over twenty three Assemblies, tagged 'Houses' with House of Hope in Maryland as current National Headquarters. Equally, the Church in USA has extended its frontiers to other nations such as Canada, Dominican, Mexico and Jamaica.

In 2007, GOFAMINT was birthed in the Philippines, an initiative of the General Overseer, Pastor (Dr) E.O. Abina. Through this initiative, GOFAMINT has launched evangelistic campaigns and established branches in four Asian countries of Northern Cyprus (Turkey), Israel, Philippines and Dubai (UAE). The church equally gained entrance into Australia with two branches.

== Ministries ==
With growth and expansion, different departments and ministries were created. They include Christian Education, Women Ministry, Men Fellowship, Music Ministry, Missions, The Power House, Youth Fellowship, Gospel Students' Fellowship, Operation Identification, Gospel Partners Forum, Child Evangelism Unit, Audio Visual Unit, GOFAMINT Online Team, GOFAMINT Drama/Film Ministries among others.

The Mission also has a Theological Seminary, Reuben George Memorial College of Theology, (formerly Gospel Bible College) with campuses in Okitipupa in Ondo State, at Gospel Town, Ojoo Ibadan with annexes in Lagos. There are also Schools of Evangelism and Missions.

== Leadership ==
The Church is being directed by the Executive Council, which is headed by the current General Overseer, Pastor (Dr) Elijah Oludele Abina.

== Statement of Purpose ==
- To preach the Word of God and to bring people into membership of God's family;
- To teach the Word of God to enhance freedom, promote Christian maturity and bind the people to God for service, and
- To live the word of God to demonstrate the new life in Christ to the World, and ensure the security of the believer

== See also ==
- Christianity in Nigeria
