= Sword of the Spirit Ministries =

Church in Nigeria

- Headquarters: The Garden of Victory Old Ife Road, P.M.B. 60, Agodi, Ibadan. Nigeria.
- Founder: Francis Wale Oke
- Origin: 1983
- Official website: sotsm.org

The Sword of the Spirit Ministries aka Christ Life Church is a Nigerian Evangelical Charismatic Pentecostal Christian denomination and a megachurch. The Ministry is presided over by Bishop Francis Wale Oke, who founded the church in 1983. It has approximately 25,000 members.

The headquarters is located in Ibadan, Oyo State, Nigeria. The organization has since become an international network of churches. The church's teachings are in the tradition of prosperity theology.

== History ==
The church began in 1983 when Francis Wale Oke brought together a team of seven fellow believers including his wife Victoria to meet every week for a prayer group.

In 1990, Sword of the Spirit Ministries led an anti-Islamic preaching crusade in Sokoto. Historian Toyin Falola mentions Sword of the Spirit Ministries as being specialized at that time in publishing anti-Islamic tracts.
