= Enoch Adeboye =

Nigerian Pastor (born 1942)

Pastor Enoch Adeboye
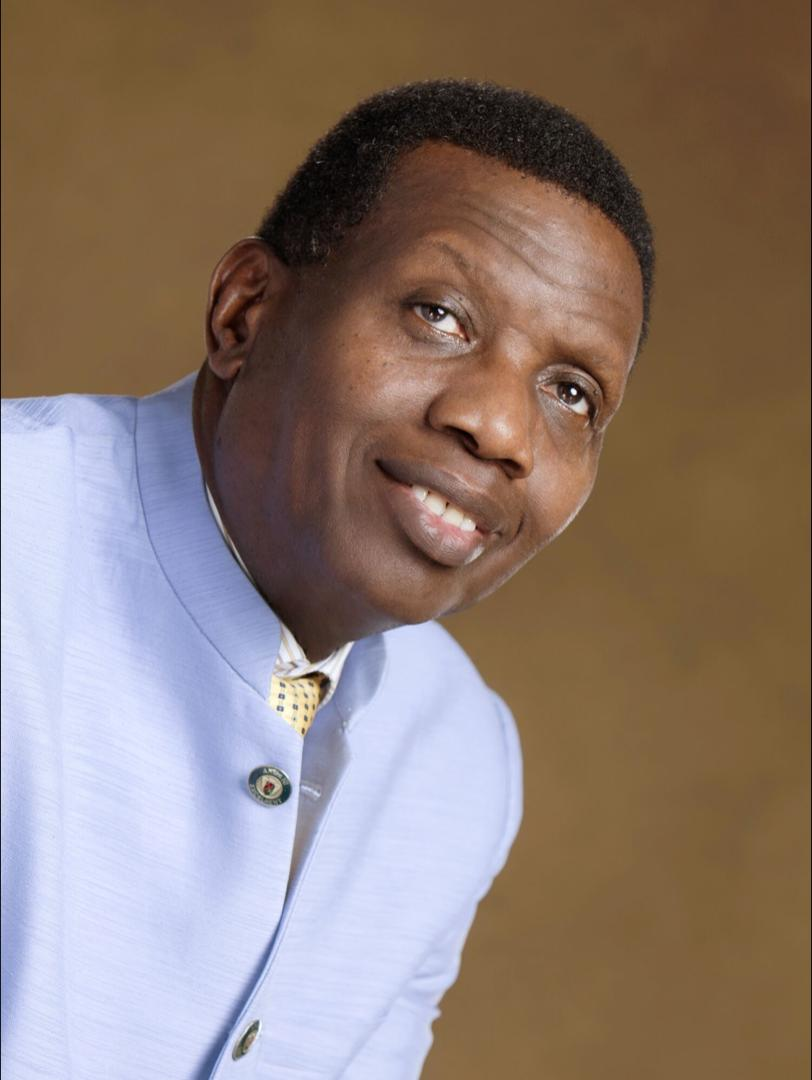

2nd President of PFN
- In office 1992–1995
- Preceding: Redeemed Christian Church of God
- Preceded by: James Boyejo
- Succeeded by: Benson Idahosa

Personal details
- Born: Enoch Adejare Adeboye; 2 March 1942 (age 84) Ifewara, Southern Region, British Nigeria (now Ifewara, Osun State, Nigeria)
- Spouse: Foluke Adeyokunnu (m. 1967)
- Occupation: Pastor

Enoch Adejare Adeboye (born 2 March 1942) is a Nigerian pastor, and the present General Overseer of The Redeemed Christian Church of God. He served as the second national president of the Pentecostal Fellowship of Nigeria.

== Early life ==
Enoch Adejare Adeboye was born on 2 March 1942 in Ifewara, near Ife, in the then Southern Region, British Nigeria. He was born into a very humble family, and often tells the story of wearing his first shoes at the age of 18.

== Education ==
Enoch Adejare Adeboye started his education at Ilesha Grammar School Ilesha Osun State in 1956. Enoch Adejare Adeboye then proceeded to the University of Nigeria Nsukka (UNN) in Nsukka, but because of the Nigeria Civil War, he completed his first degree in the University of Ife (now Obafemi Awolowo University), graduating with a Bachelor's degree in Mathematics in 1967.

In 1969, he obtained a Master's degree in Hydrodynamics from University of Lagos, and in 1975, he obtained a Ph.D. in Applied Mathematics from the University of Lagos.

== Ministry ==
Adejare Adeboye joined the Redeemed Christian Church of God in 1973 and served as an interpreter before he was ordained a pastor in the church by Pa. Josiah Akindayomi in 1975. He became General Overseer of the church in 1981. For three years, he filled the role part-time at Unilorin before giving up his university position to preach full-time. In 2017, Adeboye announced his resignation as General Overseer, but he retained the role.

The church, which was not well known before Adeboye became the General Overseer, has branches in about 198 nations as of (March 2017), including more than 14,000,000 worshipers in Nigeria. Adeboye has stated that he aims to put a church within five minutes' walking distance in developing cities and five minutes' driving distance in developed cities.

Adeboye is considered a preacher of the prosperity gospel, a claim he does not deny. He says "Pentecostals have such an impact because they talk of the here and now, not just the by and by… while we have to worry about heaven, there are some things God could do for us in the here and now."

He celebrated his 80th birthday in 2022. Adeboye's foundation donated eight dialysis machines to Wuse District Hospital, together with a reverse osmosis medical water purification system and an electrical generator.

== Publications ==
Adeboye has written several books, including:

- Open Heavens Daily Devotional
- Lessons from the Sower
- Christian Moderator
- Deadly Enemy of Man
- Divine Favour
- Kingdom Prosperity
- Fruits of the Spirit
- God of Wonders
- God’s Remembrance and Deliverance
- Prevailing Prayers
- The Wonder Working God
- Transitions
- Mathematics & Greatness
- Behold, He Cometh! Are You Prepared?
- As Pure as Light
- Last days: A Study of the Book of Revelation
- Workers in Training Manual
- In His Presence
- David
- Signs and wonders
- Are you working with God: Are you a partner?
- A biographical book titled ENOCH, detailing the life and ministry of Pastor Adeboye was released in late 2025. The book, which followed a biopic film on Pastor Adeboye, was written by Oluwakemi Sodeinde.

== University endowments ==
Adeboye has endowed four Nigerian universities, including Obafemi Awolowo University and the University of Nigeria.

== Awards and recognition ==
- 1 of the 50 most powerful people in the world by Newsweek (2008)
- Adeboye was cited as one of the Top 100 most influential Africans by New African magazine in 2019.

=== Honorary doctorates ===
He has received several honorary doctorates.

- 2009 : Honorary doctorate, University of Lagos
- 2009 : Honorary doctorate, University of Nigeria
- 2009 : Doctor of Theology, Canada Christian College
- 2011 : Honorary doctorate, University of Ibadan
- 2015 : Doctor of Science, University of Lagos
- 2016 : Honorary doctorate, Obafemi Awolowo University
- 2017 : Doctor of Divinity, University of Nigeria
- 2022 : Doctor of Divinity, Oral Roberts University

== Personal life ==
Adeboye married Folu Adeboye on 17 December 1967. He is a father to four children (three sons and a daughter) and several grandchildren from the marriage. Pastor Enoch Adeboye lost his son Dare Adeboye on 4 May 2021, who died at the age of 42. In May 2023, a film titled "Enoch" was aired, the movie gives a biopic on the life of Pastor Adeboye to celebrate his 81st birthday and Adeola Emmanuel Abolaji starred as the lead actor.

== Controversies ==
The General Overseer of the Redeemed Christian Church of God (RCCG) Enoch Adeboye, recently come under several controversies over the years related to his doctrines, and public statements

- Supremacy of RCCG members:In 2021 during a conference held by the Redeemed Christian Church of God (RCCG), the general overseer Enoch Adeboye made a controversial prayer, making a declaration that Christians from other denominations will "bow" before members of the RCCG. The declaration resurfaced in the year 2024, and the prayer generated serious criticism from users of different social media platforms. So many people saw the statement or declaration as inappropriate as a Christian spiritual, as this kind of statement could bring disunity.
- Tithing and Financial Teachings: Enoch Adeboye spoke at the April edition of the monthly Holy Ghost Service at the Redemption Camp, along Lagos/Ibadan Expressway, the cleric advised pastors of the church to warn their parishioners about the danger of ignoring tithing "I want to give every one of you pastors an opportunity to repent tonight. And then to go back, immediately after this convention, to restitute your ways with your congregation. Make it clear to them…Anyone who is not paying his tithe is not going to heaven, full stop", he said. The cleric letter tendered apologies for making the statement that Christians who don’t pay tithe might not make it to heaven, in his words he said "I apologies for saying ‘If you don’t pay tithe, you might not make it to heaven.’ I’m sorry, that’s wrong, and it’s not in the Bible. What the Bible says is ‘Follow peace with all men, and holiness, without which no man shall see God’,"
- Restrictions on Guest Preachers in parishes: A memo released in 5 January 2024, titled "Invitation of guest ministers in RCCG" which wrote "no external preacher, speaker or minister should be permitted on any of our altars or platforms." They stated that any speaker that will be invited to preach will have to undergo prior clearance. The church made it clear that this was done in other to ensure teachings align with the doctrines and beliefs of the RCCG, this sparked reactions on the social media.

== See also ==
- T.B. Joshua
- David Oyedepo
