= Benson Idahosa =

Nigerian pentecostal preacher (1938–1998)

Archbishop Benson Idahosa
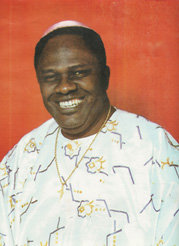
- Idahosa in 1997

3rd President of PFN
- In office 1995–1998
- Preceded by: Enoch Adeboye
- Succeeded by: Mike Okonkwo

Personal details
- Born: Benson Andrew Idahosa; 11 September 1938 Benin City, Edo, Nigeria
- Died: 12 March 1998 (aged 59) Benin City, Nigeria
- Resting place: Benin City, Nigeria
- Spouse: Archbishop Margaret Idahosa
- Children: 3 sons, 5 daughters (4 being biological and 4 adopted)
- Occupation: Televangelist, author, pastor

Benson Andrew Idahosa (11 September 1938 – 12 March 1998) was a Charismatic Pentecostal preacher. He founded Church of God Mission International. Archbishop Benson Idahosa was popularly referred to as the father of Pentecostalism in Nigeria. Idahosa was the founder of Benson Idahosa University (BIU) in Benin City, Edo State, Nigeria. His only son, Bishop F.E.B. Idahosa, is now the president of BIU, founder and president of Big Ben's Children Hospital, and vice-president of All Nations for Christ Bible Institute International, among other positions.

== Biography ==
In October 1968, Idahosa officially inaugurated the Church of God Mission International, which had started previously, as a "small prayer group". A claim made by Idahosa that he had raised eight people from the dead was dropped when challenged by the Advertising Standards Authority, who sought evidence that the individuals concerned had been dead. He was commissioned into ministry in 1971 by Pa Elton and James Gordon Lindsey. He was ordained a Bishop in 1981, and ordained several others, including Bishop David Oyedepo of the Living Faith Church Worldwide in 1989.

Idahosa died on 12 March 1998. He was survived by his wife, Margaret Idahosa and four children. His wife subsequently took over as the Archbishop of the Church of God Mission International (CGMI), the Christian ministry he founded, she is also the Chancellor of Benson Idahosa University.
