= Joseph Ayo Babalola =

Nigerian clergyman (1904–1959)

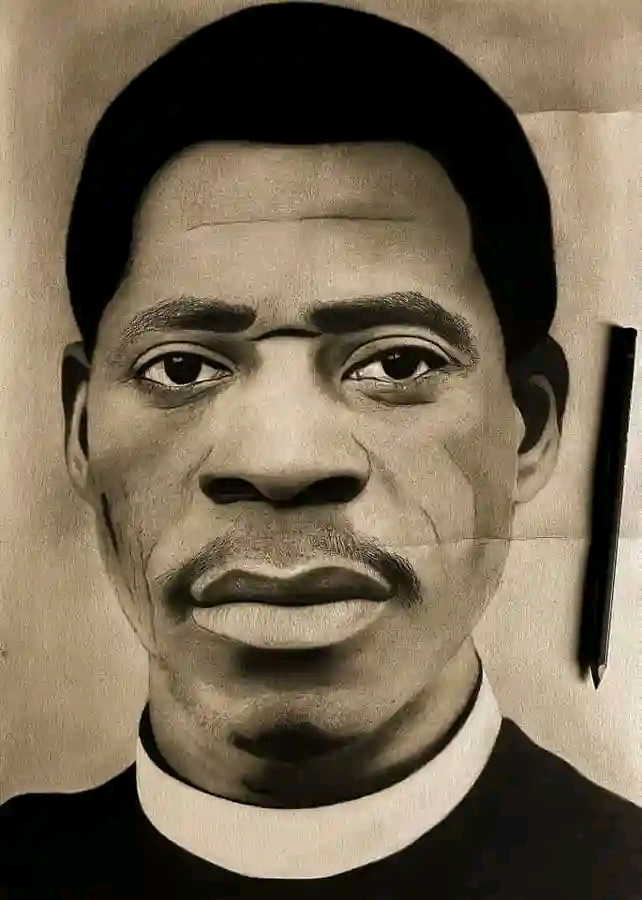
- Born: 25 April 1904; Odo-Owa, Oke-Ero, Southern Nigeria Protectorate (now Kwara State, Nigeria)
- Died: 26 July 1959 (aged 55); Ede, Western Region, British Nigeria (now Osun State, Nigeria)
- Resting place: Grave Prayer House Mausoleum Effon-Alaiye, Ekiti State, Nigeria
- Citizenship: Nigerian
- Occupations: Apostle, Preacher
- Title: Apostle Prophet
- Partner: Dorcas Babalola
- Children: Apeke Adeniyi

Joseph Ayo Babalola (25 April 1904 – 26 July 1959) was a Nigerian Christian minister and the leader of the Christ Apostolic Church, popularly called CAC in Nigeria. He was a healing evangelist.

== Early life ==
Babalola was born of Yoruba parents at Odo-Owa, in Kwara State and brought up as an Anglican. He attended elementary school at Oto-Awori on Badagry Road, Lagos State, in 1914. He then became a steamroller operator under the PWD (Public Works Department), then under the control of Great Britain. He worked as a steamroller.

== Ministry and healing ==
In 1931, Faith Tabernacle affiliated with The Apostolic Church with general headquarters in the United Kingdom (not British Apostolic Church, as erroneously stated by some authors). Following a schism in The Apostolic Church around 1940, Babalola went with a group led by Pastors J.B. Akinyele and D.O. Odubanjo to form an independent church, Christ Apostolic Church (CAC), where he continued his healing and evangelism until his death.

The CAC regards Babalola as an apostle, although he was not ordained into that office. A CAC retreat center was built at Ipo Arakeji, Osun State where Babalola was called in 1928. However, Babalola was not the sole founder of CAC as many claim, but one of three founders.

The Christ Apostolic Church outlived Babalola and grew rapidly, with many churches under the CAC name. Each church has a specific branch name. Joseph Ayo Babalola University (JABU) a private Nigerian university is located in Ipo Arakeji and Ikeji-Arakeji. Two neighbouring communities in Osun State, established by the Christ Apostolic Church Worldwide are named after him, located where he was called by God in 1928.

== Death and documentary film ==
He died in 1959 and was buried in Efon Alaaye town in Ekiti state. Baba Abiye at Ede was, however, credited with the story of his death.

A documentary film about Joseph Ayo Babalola was released by the Ogongo TV on Saturday, January 19, 2019. The movie titled "Ayipada Nla", directed by Adeoye Omoniyi and produced by Adewale Omoniyi narrates how the late Babalola started his ministry in a Yoruba village from where the revival spread to other parts of Nigeria in 1930.

== See also ==
- Cornelius Adam Igbudu
- Anglican Adam Preaching Society
- Onyeka Onwenu
- Junior Pope
