= Deeper Christian Life Ministry =

Church in Nigeria

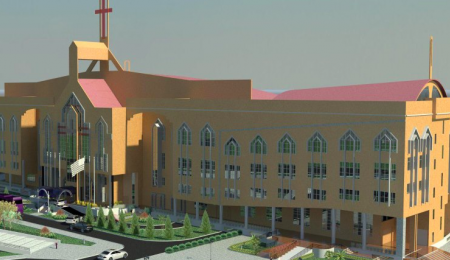
- Classification: Evangelical
- Orientation: Pentecostal
- Associations: Pentecostal/Charismatic Churches of North America
- Region: Worldwide
- Headquarters: Gbagada, Lagos State, Nigeria
- Founder: William F. Kumuyi
- Origin: 1973; 53 years ago
- Official website: dclm.org

Deeper Christian Life Ministry also known as Deeper Life Bible Church is an international Pentecostal Christian denomination with its headquarters, Deeper Life Bible Church Lagos, in Gbagada, Lagos. It is overseen by the General Superintendent of Deeper Life Bible Church, Pastor William Folorunso Kumuyi.

== History ==
In 1973, while serving as a mathematics Lecturer at the University of Lagos, W.F. Kumuyi started a Bible study group with 15 people who had come to him requesting training in the Scriptures. The church started as the Deeper Christian Life Ministry. W.F. Kumuyi was a former Anglican who joined the Apostolic Faith Church after being baptised. In 1975, he was expelled from the church for preaching without credentials. He continued his independent ministry, which in 1982 became the Deeper Life Bible Church. By the early 1980's that small group had grown to several thousands, at which time Deeper Life Bible Church was formally established. The church has spread throughout sub-Saharan Africa and then to the United Kingdom, from where branches were developed in western Europe, Russia, India, and North America.

In April 2018, The Deeper Christian Life Ministry had its new headquarters church at Gbagada commissioned with the former Vice President of Nigeria, Professor Yemi Osinbajo in attendance among other dignitaries

In 2025, the Lagos Church had over 65,000 people. The denomination as a whole claims to have over 800,000 members in Nigeria with over 5,500 churches. They also state to have over 3,000 churches in 40 other countries.

The Deeper Christian Life Ministry is a member of the Pentecostal/Charismatic Churches of North America, an interdenominational fellowship of churches with a footprint in North America.

== Beliefs ==
The denomination has a Pentecostal confession of faith. The church has 22 core beliefs.

- The Holy Bible
- The Godhead
- Virgin birth of Jesus
- Total depravity
- Repentance
- Restitution
- Justification by faith
- Water Baptism
- Lord's Supper
- Sanctification
- Holy Ghost Baptism
- Redemption
- Personal Evangelism
- Marriage
- Rapture
- Resurrection of the dead
- Great tribulation
- Second Coming of Christ
- Christ millennial reign
- Great White Throne Judgement
- New Heaven and the New Earth
- Hell fire

== See also ==
- African-initiated church
- List of the largest evangelical churches
- List of the largest evangelical church auditoriums

== Bibliography ==
- Anderson, Allan (2001). African reformation: African initiated Christianity in the 20th century. Africa Research & Publications. pp. 172–173. ISBN 0-86543-884-6.
- Neumann, Mikel (1999). Home Groups for Urban Cultures: Biblical Small Group Ministry on Five Continents. William Carey Library. p. 9. ISBN 0-87808-281-6.
