= William Kumuyi =

Nigerian Christian leader (born 1941)

William F. Kumuyi Ed.D.
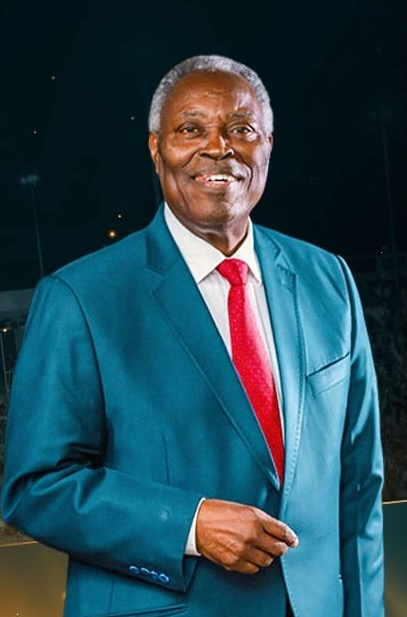

Convener of Global Crusade with Kumuyi and General Superintendent of Deeper Christian Life Ministry
- Incumbent
- Assumed office 1973
- Preceded by: Office established

Personal details
- Born: William Folorunso Ikumuyiwa; 6 June 1941 (age 85) Erin-Odo Ijesha, Osun State, Nigeria
- Spouses: Abiodun Kumuyi (m. 1980; died 2009) Esther Folashade Kumuyi (m. 2010)
- Children: 2
- Education: Mayflower School
- Alma mater: University of Ibadan (BSc); University of Lagos (PGCertEd)
- Occupation: Pastor; author; televangelist
- Known for: Holiness movement
- Website: https://dclm.org/about/w-f-kumuyi/; https://gckhq.org/about-us/

William Folorunso Kumuyi (born 6 June 1941) is the convener of Global Crusade with Kumuyi (GCK), and the founder and General Superintendent of the Deeper Christian Life Ministry situated at Gbagada, Lagos, Nigeria. He is the author of several Christian books and devotionals.

== Background ==
Kumuyi was born into a Christian family in Erin-Ijesa, Osun State, in the western part of Nigeria. He completed his secondary school education in 1961 at Mayflower School in Ikenne, Ogun State, from where he proceeded to the University of Ibadan and in 1967 graduated with a first-class honours degree in mathematics where he graduated as overall best graduating student in that year. He subsequently took a post-graduate course in Education at the University of Lagos. He became a born-again Christian on Sunday, 5 April 1964 at 23.

On his upbringing, Kumuyi was quoted to have said

We would get up in the morning, read the Bible, sing hymns, and go to church regularly. When I went to secondary school I lost interest in the church because our principal taught us atheism. But after a while, I thought again and started going to various churches in town. Eventually, in 1963, a group of singers and preachers from a Gospel church got permission to come to the school. I understood the Gospel message and was born again on April 5th, 1964. I read John Wesley, Charles Finney, Spurgeon, and lots of other books. I got involved with the Scripture Union, and I grew.

Kumuyi was influenced by John Wesley, Charles Finney and Charles Spurgeon. His father was a member of the Anglican Church.

== Teaching career ==
Kumuyi began teaching mathematics in 1962 at Mayflower School, his alma mater. He went on, in August 1973, to become a Professor of mathematics at the University of Lagos.

He specialised in pure mathematics. He taught at the University of Lagos becoming a Professor in August of 1973. Teaching and researching complex variables.

Kumuyi had his doctoral studies in USSR together with five other Nigerian students. He had been at the University of Birmingham United Kingdom for post doc. He has also been to the USA for sabbatical.

== Christian ministry ==
In 1973, while a Professor of mathematics at the University of Lagos, Kumuyi began a Bible study group with 15 students who had come to him for Bible training. This training led to the foundation of the Deeper Christian Life Ministry. In 1975, Kumuyi was expelled from the Apostolic Faith Church for preaching on the baptism of the Holy Spirit. He continued his independent ministry, which in 1982 became the Deeper Life Bible Church. As at 2005, the Christian ministry is said to have over 800,000 affiliates.

== Place of worship ==
The Deeper Christian Life Ministry founded by Kumuyi has headquarters in Gbagada, Lagos. The church auditorium at the headquarters could seat up to 30,000 worshippers; it was described by experts as the fourth largest in the world. The auditorium was inaugurated on 24 April 2018; the Vice President of Nigeria Yemi Osinbajo, and other important dignitaries attended the inauguration.

Other places of worship of his Christian ministry include: the Deeper Life Conference Centre in Ogun State at Kilometer 42, Lagos–Ibadan Expressway and the International Bible Training Centre (IBTC) at Ayobo, Lagos.

== Published books ==
- The Hour of Decision, 1990, ISBN 978-2367-70-2
- How to Know God's Will in Marriage, 1990, ISBN 978-9-78236-713-6
- Have Compassion on Them, 1991, ISBN 978-9-78236-700-6
- The Spirit Controlled Family: W.F. Kumuyi, 1996, ISBN 978-9-78236-742-6
- The Lord's Prayer, 1997, ISBN 978-1-85424-370-6
- The Truly Liberated Woman, 2000, ISBN 978-978-2908-25-4
- Supernatural Supply in All Situations, 2009, ISBN 978-0-88144-416-2
- Daily Manna, Volume 1, 2011, ISBN 978-1-90549-379-1
- Daily Manna: A Daily Devotional Guide, 2014, ISBN 978-1-46759-809-5
- Higher Everyday: A Daily Devotional Guide for Successful Youths, 2014, ISBN 978-1-46759-810-1

== Personal life ==
Kumuyi met Abiodun Olowu in September 1972. She became one of his Bible study students and a member of his fledging Christian ministry. They married on 13 September 1980 in Lagos, and had two children, Jeremiah and John. Abiodun Kumuyi died on 11 April 2009.

On 13 October 2010, Kumuyi married Folashade Adenike Blaize in London. Folashade was the administrator of the Deeper Life Bible Church, London.

In January 2025, Kumuyi was invited by Donald Trump to attend his second inauguration on 20 January 2025. He was said to have commended Trump for "his bold commitment to defending Christian values and championing international religious freedom throughout his first term in office".

== Recognition ==
In 2013, Foreign Policy magazine listed Kumuyi among the "500 most powerful people on the planet".

In 2018, Kumuyi received an honorary PhD from the University of Abuja.

In July 2026, Kumuyi was recognized by the World Book of Records, London under its Excellence category for his contributions to evangelism, education, and humanitarian services.

== Global Crusade with Kumuyi (GCK) ==
Kumuyi began conducting a series of Global Gospel Crusades in April 2021, starting in Abuja, Nigeria. Subsequent editions were held in June, July, and August 2021 in Abuja, Calabar, and Enugu, respectively. These events were broadcast globally, with participants joining via social media and dedicated Zoom connections. The August 2021 edition featured gospel artist Don Moen, who ministered alongside Kumuyi. In July 2022, the crusade series was officially branded as Global Crusade with Kumuyi (GCK). The launch event was attended by former Nigerian President Olusegun Obasanjo and former Zambian Vice President Nevers Mumba, among others.

Since 2022, the GCK has expanded internationally, reaching locations across the Global South, including India, the Philippines, Australia, New Zealand, and Vanuatu. During the Vanuatu crusade, Kumuyi was hosted to a breakfast by President Nikenike Vurobaravu, government officials, chiefs, and State House staff.

In March 2025, the GCK held its first conference in the Global North, with events in three Canadian cities: Granby (Quebec), Hamilton (Ontario), and Toronto (Ontario). According to the National Religious Broadcasters (NRB) of which GCK is a member, the GCK has attracted over 5 million physical attendees since its inception in 2021, with more than 700,000 people committing to Christ during these events.

== Invitation to Trump's Inauguration ==
In January 2025, Kumuyi was specially invited by the White house chaplain to the U.S. President Donald Trump to attend his second inauguration on 20 January 2025. Kumuyi commended Trump for his commitment to defending Christian values and promoting international religious freedom during his first term in office.

== Biography ==
A book-length biography of Kumuyi was written and published in 2021 by Banji Ojewale. The biography of 325 pages is entitled, Kumuyi: Defender of the Faith. The foreword was written by Enoch Adeboye. Former Vice President of Nigeria Yemi Osibanjo and Lagos state governor BabaJide Sanwo-olu were at the launch of the book.
