= Church of God Mission International =

Christian denomination from Nigeria

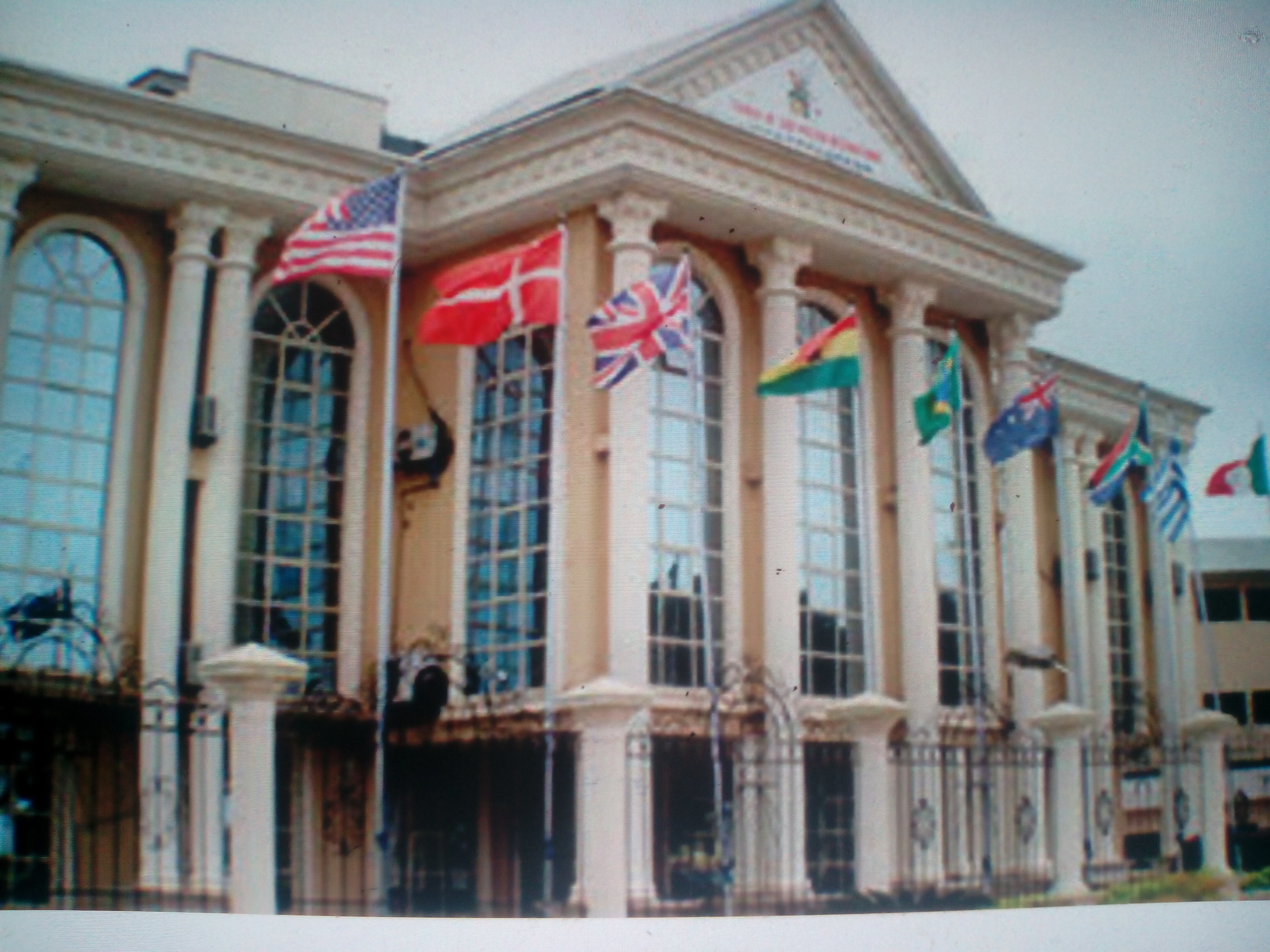
Church of God mission international (CGMI headquarters office building) Benin City, Nigeria

Church of God Mission International is a Christian denomination from Nigeria. The headquarters is in Benin City, Nigeria, is a megachurch. It was founded by Benson Idahosa in 1968. Mathew Okpebholo currently serves as the senior bishop emeritus of the church.

== See also ==
- Christianity in Nigeria
- Nigerian sectarian violence
