= List of churches in Nigeria =

According to Pew Research, Nigeria is the second most religious country in the world. Its populace is evenly divided between the largely Muslim north and the predominantly Christian south.

Below is a list of notable churches in Nigeria. It also contains the year of establishment, founder and the current general overseer of the congregation.

Church name	Founder	Current senior pastor/general overseer	Date established	Location	Reference
Catholic Church	Jesus Christ (according to tradition)	Leo XIV (as leader of the global Catholic Church) Matthew Man-Oso Ndagoso (as President of the Catholic Bishops' Conference of Nigeria)	33AD (according to tradition)	Abuja (Catholic Secretariat of Nigeria)	
The Redeemed Christian Church of God	Rev Josiah Akindayomi	Pastor Enoch Adeboye	1952	Lagos State	
The Redeemed Evangelical Mission	Bishop Mike Okonkwo	Bishop Mike Okonkwo	1981	Lagos State	
Living Faith Church Worldwide	David Oyedepo	David Oyedepo	1981	Ota, Ogun	
Christ Apostolic Church	Joseph Ayo Babalola	Pastor Samuel O. Oladele	1930		
Church of Nigeria	Henry Townsend	Henry Ndukuba	1842	Badagry	
The African Church	Jacob Kehinde Coker	Emmanuel Josiah Udofia	1901	Lagos	
Christ Embassy	Chris Oyakhilome	Chris Oyakhilome	1990	Lagos State	
Deeper Christian Life Ministry	William Kumuyi	William F. Kumuyi	1982	Lagos State	
Cherubim and Seraphim	Moses Orimolade Tunolase		1925		
Mountain of Fire and Miracles	Dr. Daniel Kolawole Olukoya	Dr Daniel Kolawole Olukoya	1989	Yaba	
The Apostolic Church Nigeria		Emmanuel Segun Awojide	1918	Lagos State	
Church of the Lord	Josiah Ollunowo Ositelu		1925	Ogere	
Celestial Church of Christ	Samuel Biléhou Joseph Oshoffa		1947	Cotonou	
Methodist Church Nigeria	British missionaries	Prelate Samuel Chukwuemeka Kanu Uche, JP	1842	Marina/Lagos State	
Nigerian Baptist Convention	Southern Baptist Convention missionaries	Rev. Israel Akanji	1850/1914		
Salvation Ministries	Pastor David Ibiyeomie	David Ibiyeomie	1997	Port-Harcourt	
Full Life Christian Centre	Rev. Ntia I. Ntia	Rev. Ntia I. Ntia	2000	Akwa Ibom State	
Royal House of Grace International Church	Apostle Zilly Aggrey	King-David Zilly Aggrey	1992	Port-Harcourt	
Word of Life Bible Church	Ayo Oritsejafor	Ayo Oritsejafor	1987	Warri	
Assemblies of God Church	The Holy Spirit	Rev. Chidi Okoroafor	1934	Enugu	
Evangelical Church Winning All	Walter Gowans, Thomas Kent, Rowland Bingham	Rev. Dr. Job Ayuba Bagat Mallam	1954	Jos	
The Salvation Army	William Booth	Colonel Victor Leslie	1920	Lagos	
Celebration Church International	Emmanuel Iren	Emmanuel Iren	2012	Lagos	

== See also ==
- List of notable pastors in Nigeria
