= Christian Council of Nigeria =

- Abbreviation: CCN
- Formation: 1929 (as Missionary Association); 1930 (as Christian Council of Nigeria)
- Founded at: Ibadan / Lagos, Nigeria
- Type: Ecumenical organisation
- Headquarters: Nigeria
- Region served: Nigeria
- Members: Various Protestant and African-initiated churches
- President: Most Rev. Dr David O. Chikezie Onuoha
- General Secretary: Rt. Rev. M. Evans Onyemara Ph.D.
- Affiliations: Christian Association of Nigeria (one of five blocs); World Council of Churches
- Website: ccnnigeria.org.ng

The Christian Council of Nigeria (CCN) is the pioneer ecumenical body in Nigeria that serves as a fellowship of churches committed to promoting Christian unity, social justice, and upholding Christian values. It is one of the five blocs that constitute the Christian Association of Nigeria (CAN).

== History ==
The Christian Council of Nigeria traces its origins to November 1929, when a small group of missionaries in southern Nigeria held an informal meeting in Ibadan to discuss the implications of a new Educational law that sought to separate religion from education. This gathering involved representatives from mainland Protestant churches.

The success of their collaborative efforts in education encouraged the missionaries to formalise their association. In March 1930, a meeting was held in Lagos where a constitution was adopted, and the organisation was officially named the Christian Council of Nigeria. Early efforts were made to include the Roman Catholic Church, but it did not join, viewing the CCN as a Protestant initiative.

For the first dozen years, leadership was primarily in the hands of missionaries. Over time, the CCN evolved from focusing mainly on educational issues to addressing broader matters affecting the lives of Nigerians, including social justice, peace, and national development. It has since become the central ecumenical body for traditional Protestant and many African-initiated churches in Nigeria.

The CCN is affiliated with the World Council of Churches.

== Activities ==
The CCN engages in advocacy for peace, equity, and social justice. It organises seminars, workshops, and empowerment programmes, establishes peace centres, and collaborates with other religious groups and government bodies on issues of national concern, including responses to violence and insecurity affecting Christian communities.

It also maintains specialised wings for women and youth.

== Membership ==
CCN comprises various Protestant, mainline, and African-initiated churches. Member churches include:

- Church of Nigeria (Anglican Communion)
- Methodist Church Nigeria
- Nigerian Baptist Convention
- Presbyterian Church of Nigeria
- The African Church
- United Evangelical Church (formerly Qua Iboe Church)
- The Salvation Army
- Lutheran Church of Christ in Nigeria
- The Church of the Lord (Aladura)
- African Methodist Episcopal Zion Church
- And others

It does not include the Catholic Church or most Pentecostal churches, which belong to other blocs in CAN.

== Structure and governance ==
The Christian Council of Nigeria (CCN) comprises national, state and local government levels, each with its own leadership.

At the national level, CCN is headed by the National Executive Council and the Governing Board. The National Executive Council consists of the President, Vice President, General Secretary, Treasurer, and legal adviser.

CCN Governing Board comprises representatives from member churches and organisations. They have a regular tri-annual General Assembly.

The state chapters are led by a chairman and composed of appointed and elected officers, such as the state directors and local government chairmen within the state. CCN also has a women and youth wing.

== Leadership ==
The leadership of the Christian Council of Nigeria consists of a President, Vice President, General Secretary and other officers elected or appointed from among its member churches. According to the latest available information, the president is Most Rev. Dr David O. Chikezie Onuoha, and the general secretary is Rt. Rev. M. Evans Onyemara, Ph.D., of the Methodist Church of Nigeria.

=== Past General Secretaries ===
#	Name	Denomination	Years
1	The Rev. Theophilus A. Adejumobi	Nigerian Baptist Convention	1962 – 1967
2	Rt. Rev. John I. A. Falope	Church of Nigeria (Anglican Communion)	1967 – 1970
3	Mr. Charles Obasola Olawale Williams	Methodist Church Nigeria	1970 – 1999
4	Most Rev. Ubon Bassey Usung	Presbyterian Church of Nigeria	1999 – 2004
5	Rev. Barr. Ikechukwu Okorie	Presbyterian Church of Nigeria	2004 – 2007
6	Rev. Barr. Obafemi Ogbe (Acting)	Church of the Lord (Aladura)	2007 – 2010
7	Rev. (Dr.) Yusuf Ibrahim Wushishi	Nigerian Baptist Convention	2010 – 2019
8	Very Rev. M. Evans Onyemara Ph.D.	Methodist Church Nigeria	2019 – Till Date

=== Past Presidents ===
#	Name	Denomination	Years
1	Rev’d N.O. Dada, O.B.F.	Methodist Church Nigeria	1951 – 1953
2	Rt. Rev’d S.O. Odutola, O.B.E., M.A., Dip. Th., D.D.	Church of Nigeria (Anglican Communion)	1958 – 1960
3	Dr. G.R. Ademola, M.B., B.S.D.P.H.	Church of Nigeria (Anglican Communion)	1960 – 1962
4	Sir. Louis Mbanefo, M.A., Lln	Church of Nigeria (Anglican Communion)	1964 – 1970
5	Chief S.J. Mariere	Church of Nigeria (Anglican Communion)	Dec 1970 – May 1971
6	Rev’d Dr. E.A. Dahunsi, B.Sc., B.D. Th.D.	Nigerian Baptist Convention	1971 – 1973
7	Rt. Rev’d F.O. Segun	Church of Nigeria (Anglican Communion)	1973 – 1976
8	Elder N.U. Akpan O.F.R.	Presbyterian Church of Nigeria	1976 – 1979
9	Hon. Justice J.A. Adefarasin	Church of Nigeria (Anglican Communion)	1979 – 1982
10	Hon. Mr. Justice J.H. Danduara	Church of Nigeria (Anglican Communion)	1982 – 1985
11	Barr. F.O. Ihenacho C.F.R., C.M.G., M.A.	Church of Nigeria (Anglican Communion)	1985 – 1987
12	Chief Ade Akomolafe, B.A., Dip. Ed, J.P. (Acting President)	Church of Nigeria (Anglican Communion)	1987 – 1989
13	Chief Ade Akomolafe, B.A., Dip. Ed, J.P. (President)	Church of Nigeria (Anglican Communion)	1991 – 1992
14	Rev’d Luther D. Cishak, B.A.	COCIN	1992 – 1996
15	Rt. Rev’d C.C. Anyanwu M.A. Dip. Th., D.R.S.	Church of Nigeria (Anglican Communion)	1996 – 1998
16	Rev’d Dr. S.A. Faleye M.A. Ph.D.	Nigerian Baptist Convention	1998 – 2001
17	Most Rev’d Dr. Josiah Idowu Fearon	Church of Nigeria (Anglican Communion)	2001 – 2004
18	Most Rev’d Dr. Rogers Uwadi	Methodist Church Nigeria	2004 – 2010
19	The Most Rev’d Emmanuel J. Udofia	The African Church of Nigeria	2010 – 2016
20	Most Rev. Dr. Benebo Fubara Fubara Manuel	Presbyterian Church of Nigeria	2016 – 2022

== Relationship with Christian Association of Nigeria ==
The CCN forms the mainline Protestant bloc within the Christian Association of Nigeria (CAN), founded in 1976. The other blocs are the Catholic Secretariat of Nigeria, the Pentecostal Fellowship of Nigeria, the Organisation of African Instituted Churches, and the Evangelical Church Winning All / Fellowship of Churches of Christ in Nigeria.

== See also ==
- Christian Association of Nigeria
- Christianity in Nigeria
- Ecumenism
