= Supo Ayokunle =

Nigerian pastor and administrator (born 1957)

6th President of CAN

Pastor
- Incumbent
- Assumed office 2016
- Vice President: Caleb Ahima
- Preceded by: Ayo Oritsejafor
- Succeeded by: Daniel Okoh

6th President of NBC

Personal details
- Born: Samson Olasupo Adeniyi Ayokunle; 25 January 1957 (age 69) Oyo State, Nigeria
- Spouse: Deborah Ayokunle (m. 1987)
- Children: 3
- Parent(s): Amos Ogunkunle; Theresa Bibilari Ogunkunle
- Occupation: Pastor

Samson Olasupo Adeniyi Ayokunle, CON (born 25 January 1957) commonly known as Supo Ayokunle is a Nigerian pastor and administrator. He was the 6th president of the Christian Association of Nigeria. He was also the 6th President of the Nigerian Baptist Convention.

He was born in Oyo State, Nigeria and married Deborah Ayokunle (née Adesipo). Until becoming a pastor, Ayokunle worked as a teacher and public administrator.

== Early life ==
Olasupo Ayokunle was born into the family of Amos Ogunkunle and Theresa Bibilari Ogunkunle of Jagun Alawusa House, Isheke, Oyo Town in Oyo State.

== Education ==
He attended Oniyanrin Baptist Central Day School, Iware Road, Oyo State, graduated in 1971, earning his West African School Leaving Certificate Ordinary Level in 1977. He received his Bachelor of Science in Sociology from the University of Ibadan in 1983. He enrolled for a Post Graduate Diploma in Education in 1986. Ayokunle holds master's of divinity degree in Theology in 1992 at the Nigerian Baptist Theological Seminary, Ogbomoso, master's degree in Guidance and Counselling from University of Ibadan, Master's degree in Theology and Religious studies, Liverpool Hope University, Liverpool in 2000 and 2003 respectively and Doctor of Philosophy (Ph.D) degree in Theology in 2008.

== Nigerian Baptist Convention ==
Ayokunle was elected the 6th Nigerian General Secretary (now President/CEO) of the Nigerian Baptist Convention.

=== Christian Association of Nigeria ===
In 2016 he was made President of the Christian Association of Nigeria (CAN], the largest Christian ecumenical body in Africa, after Pastor Ayo Oritsejafor left office. He was re-elected in 2019 for another term.

== Publications ==
=== Books ===
- Major Keys to a Successful Christian marriage and the Family. Day Star Press, 1997
- Weapons for Winning your Battles. Ibadan: Baptist Press, 1998
- Fighting to Win. Glad Tidings Publishers, Ibadan: Glad Tidings Publishers, 1999
- ‘The Role of the Preacher in Minimizing the use of Religion for Violence’ in Ecclesiastes: The Preacher, the Church and the Contemporary Society ed. by Ademola Ishola and Deji Ayegboyin. Ibadan: Baptist Press, 2006
- Effective Christian Leadership in the 21st Century, ed. Ibadan: Baptist Press, 2010
- Building a Witnessing Family. Lagos: Dunamis Windows Resource, 2012
- ‘The Minister’s Family: A Glorious Example’ in The Minister and his Family (A Resource Book for The Life Builders’ Conference, 2009
- Church Communication and Conflict Management for Strategic Church Leaders, 2014
- Integrity: Key to Success in Leadership, 2015

== Articles ==
Ayokunle has written several articles for the Nigerian Baptist Magazine, the monthly publication of the Nigerian Baptist Convention.

- ‘The Secret Life of a Vessel that Liberates’ in Kingdom Leaders: Vessels of Liberation. (A resource book for the Nigerian Baptist Convention’s General Workers’ Conference held at Bowen University, Iwo from 1-3 February 2010), pp. 1–14
- ‘The Minister and the Spiritual Mandate’ in The Minister and Spiritual Gifts. (Resource Book for the Ministers’ Conference, 2010, Baptist College of Theology, Oyo), pp. 25–31
- ‘Leadership Pitfalls: Preventing the Killer Diseases’ in Effective Christian Leadership in the 21st Century’ ed. by Rev. Dr. Supo Ayokunle. Ibadan: Baptist Press, 2010, pp. 37–50

== Award ==
In October 2022, a Nigerian national honour of Commander of the Order of the Niger (CON) was conferred on him by President Muhammadu Buhari.
