= Stephen Adegbite =

Nigerian bishop

The Rt. Rev. Dr. Stephen Tunde Victor Adegbite
- Born: Stephen Tunde Victor Adegbite; August 17, 1968 (age 58); Oyo State, Nigeria
- Other name: STV Adegbite
- Education: Immanuel College of Theology, Ibadan; University of Ibadan
- Occupations: Bishop, theologian, administrator
- Known for: Executive Secretary, Nigerian Christian Pilgrim Commission (NCPC); Chairman, Christian Association of Nigeria (CAN), Lagos State
- Spouse: Princess Adewunmi Fadeke Adegbite

Stephen Tunde Victor Adegbite (born 17 August 1968), is a Nigerian bishop of the Methodist Church Nigeria, theologian, and public administrator. He serves as the Executive Secretary of the Nigerian Christian Pilgrim Commission (NCPC) and Chaplain of the Aso Rock Villa Chapel. He is also the Bishop of the Diocese of Ikeja and the Chairman of the Lagos State chapter of the Christian Association of Nigeria (CAN).

== Early life and education ==
Adegbite was born on 17 August 1968 in Oyo State, Nigeria. He attended Fiditi Grammar School, Fiditi, from 1979 to 1985. He then studied at Immanuel College of Theology, Ibadan (1988–1991), earning Diplomas in Theology and Religious Studies. He obtained a Bachelor of Arts (Honours) in Religious Studies from the University of Ibadan (1992–1995), followed by a Master of Arts in Ethics (1998) and a Doctor of Philosophy (PhD) from the same university in January 2022.

He also attended management and administration courses, including the CORAT programme in Kenya (2008) and multiple Management Courses for Presbyters at ASCON, Badagry.

== Ministry and career ==
Adegbite is an ordained minister in the Methodist Church Nigeria. He has served in various capacities, including as Presbyter at Wesley Cathedral, Olowogbowo, Lagos (during which a new church building was constructed), Proto-Presbyter at Methodist Church of the Trinity, Tinubu, Lagos (2012–2015), and Synod Secretary for both Trinity Church Council and Lagos Diocese. He was also Coordinator of Lay Preachers in the Archdiocese of Lagos and Chairman of City Wide Crusade for Lagos Diocese.

He rose to become Bishop of the Diocese of Ikeja and has served as the supervising Bishop for Igbobi College, Lagos, representing the Methodist Church Nigeria. He was formerly Chairman of the Christian Council of Nigeria (CCN), Lagos State, and later Chairman of CCN Southwest. He has led Christian pilgrimages to Jerusalem and other holy sites for over 23 years.

In January 2024, President Bola Tinubu appointed him as the Executive Secretary of the Nigerian Christian Pilgrim Commission (NCPC), making him the 4th substantive holder of the office. He also serves as Chaplain of the Aso Rock Villa Chapel in Abuja.

== Leadership in Christian organisations ==
Adegbite has held ecumenical positions. He served as Chairman of the Christian Association of Nigeria (CAN), Lagos State chapter (re-elected for a second term). He is a member of the Inter-Faith Committee of Lagos State under the Nigeria Inter-Religious Council (NIREC). He has been recognised for promoting interfaith harmony and Christian unity.

He is known as a preacher, scholar, and advocate for good governance, peace, and religious harmony in Nigeria.

== Personal life ==
Adegbite was married to Mrs Funmilayo Adetifewa Adegbite, and they had children together. He remarried Princess Adewunmi Fadeke Adegbite, and they have four children.

== Awards and recognition ==
Adegbite has received academic and professional honours throughout his career. He was awarded:

- Best Student in English Language at Immanuel College of Theology, Ibadan (1991)
- Best Student in the Department of Religious Studies, University of Ibadan (1996 set)
- Best Postgraduate Student, University of Ibadan (1998 set)

He has received awards from various Christian bodies and organisations. Notable honours include:

- Presidential Lifetime Achievement Award and Honorary Professor in Humanitarianism, conferred by Heart Bible International University and Seminary, USA (July 2024)
- Africa Christian Lifetime Achievement Award (presented by CLIMA Awards and Magazine)
- Award of Excellence, presented by the Coalition of Nigerian Christian Bishops and Clerics (28 August 2025)
- Life Patron Award by the National APC Christian Leaders Forum of Nigeria (November 2025)
- Meritorious Service Award by the Charismatic Bishops Conference of Nigeria (CBCN) (June 13, 2024)

== See also ==
- Nigerian Christian Pilgrim Commission
- Christian Association of Nigeria
- Methodist Church Nigeria
- Christian Council of Nigeria
