= Odutola =

Odùtọ́lá
- Gender: Male
- Language: Yoruba

Origin
- Origin: Nigerian
- Meaning: The Ifá corpus is enough for wealth.
- Region of origin: South West, Nigeria

Odùtọ́lá audio is a Nigerian surname. It is a male name and of Yoruba origin, which means "The Ifá corpus is enough for wealth.". The name Odùtọ́lá is common among the Ijebu and Ogun people of the Southwest, Nigeria.

== Notable individuals with the name ==
- Timothy Odutola (1902–1995), Nigerian businessman
- Solomon Odunaiya Odutola (c. 1897–?), Nigerian Anglican clergyman
- Toyin Ojih Odutola (born 1985), Nigerian visual artist
- Ebun Clark, Nigerian professor
- Reverend M.O Dada, First African Methodist Bishop
- Kole Ade-Odutola, Nigerian Yoruba poet, photographer, and academic
