= 2023 Mangu violence =

Massacre in Plateau State, Nigeria

- Part of Herder-farmer conflicts in Nigeria
- Location: Mangu LGA, Plateau State, Nigeria
- Date: May 15-16, 2023
- Deaths: 200+ civilians killed (per local activists); 130+ civilians killed (per government officials and Christian Association of Nigeria)
- Perpetrator: Fulani herdsmen

From 15 to 16 May 2023 over one hundred people were killed in an attack by Fulani herders against villagers in Mangu Local Government Area of Plateau State, Nigeria.

== Background ==
Fighting between (mostly Christian) farmers and Fulani herders in Central and North-West Nigeria over access to resources has been going on for several decades. Most of the violence takes place in the form of attacks on villages by Fulani herders, sometimes as reprisals for attacks by anti-Fulani vigilantes. The government response to the conflict has been largely inefficient and few arrests have been made. In recent years the security crisis has grown worse as the death toll increases and violence becomes more common. Prior to the conflict a farmer had let his cattle destroy a Fulani man's banana plantation which locals claimed was the trigger for the attack.

== Attacks ==
The conflict started at 2:00 AM local time on 15 May 2023, when huge numbers of Fulani gunmen attacked and burned multiple villages, including Kubwat and Fungzai where 28 and 9 people were reportedly killed, respectively. Women and children were said to be among the dead. Houses and crops were set ablaze as assailants attacked villagers using guns and machetes.

The Governor of Plateau State, Simon Lalong, condemned the massacre and promised to arrest the perpetrators. The local government declared a 24-hour curfew, but locals criticized the curfew as ineffective. On 18 May local authorities told the Associated Press at least 80 people had died, and that they had arrested at least 7 suspects.

On 17 May, House of Representatives member for Mangu LGA Solomon Maren said that "over 100 persons, most of them women and children" had died over the past two days and that widespread destruction of homes and crops had occurred. Maren criticized the Buhari administration for failing to prevent such attacks.

On 22 May, the Christian Association of Nigeria said that over the past week "about 130 people were killed, about 1,000 buildings burnt, and about 22 villages affected." Archbishop and president of the CAN Daniel Okoh deplored the massacre and called for an end to the violence. Activist Joseph Gwankat, head of the Mwaghavul Development Association, estimated the death toll to be more than 200, adding that 20,000 people are believed to have been displaced. The fighting also cut off access to certain villages. Gwankat said that at least 125 bodies had been buried.

== Aftermath ==
On 21 May, Fulani militias passed by the town of Daika in Panyam District on motorcycles. The militants opened fire on a group of young men, killing four.

On 25 May, church leaders led a group of around 250 protesters in Jos, urging the government to take action.
