= Bolanle Otegbayo =

Nigerian professor and researcher

Prof Bolanle Otegbayo
- Occupation: Academic

Academic background
- Education: University of Ibadan

Academic work
- Discipline: Food Science
- Institutions: Bowen University

Bolanle Omolara Otegbayo is a Nigerian professor of food science and technology. She is a member of Africa Academy of Sciences and the current Provost of Bowen University College of Post graduate Studies (COPGS).

== Education ==
Bolanle initially gained admission into the University of Ibadan to study Animal Science, but after her 100 level she considered Food Science. She later gained admission into Obafemi Awolowo University to study Food Science and Technology from 10/09/1986 to 10/01/1994 for her Bachelor of Science degree. She proceeded to gain a Masters degree in Food Technology at the University of Ibadan from 01/04/1997 to 01/05/1998. She got her Ph.D in Food Technology at the University of Ibadan between 16/09/1998 to 09/07/2004.

== Career ==
Bolanle is an academician and currently lecturing at the Bowen University Food Science and Technology Department where she focuses on identifying determinants in quality of food in crops to make sure there is good stakeholders delivering in the value chain.

== Memberships and award ==
In 2024, she was elected as a member of an African Academy of Sciences. In 2011 and 2012, she was awarded Postdoctoral Fellowship of African Women in Agricultural Research and Development (AWARD).

== Notable Publications ==
- Otegbayo, Bolanle; Oluyinka, Oroniran; Tanimola, Abiola R.; Bisi, Fawehinmi; Ayomide, Alamu; Tomilola, Bolaji; Madu, Tessy; Okoye, Benjamin; Chijioke, Ugo; Ofoeze, Miriam; Alamu, Emmanuel Oladeji; Adesokan, Michael; Ayetigbo, Oluwatoyin; Bouniol, Alexandre; DJibril-Mousa, Imayath; Adinsi, Laurent; Akissoe, Noël; Cornet, Denis; Agre, Parterne; Asfaw, Asrat; Obidiegwu, Jude; Maziya-Dixon, Busie (2024). "Food quality profile of pounded yam and implications for yam breeding". Journal of the Science of Food and Agriculture. 104 (8): 4635–4651. Bibcode:2024JSFA..104.4635O. doi:10.1002/jsfa.12835. hdl:10568/132099. ISSN 0022-5142. PMID 37439058.
- Adesokan, Michael; Alamu, Emmanuel Oladeji; Otegbayo, Bolanle; Asfaw, Asrat; Afolabi, Michael Olutoyin; Fawole, Segun; Meghar, Karima; Dufour, Dominique; Ayetigbo, Oluwatoyin; Davrieux, Fabrice; Maziya-Dixon, Busie (2025). "Rapid analysis of starch, sugar, and amylose in fresh yam tubers and boiled yam texture using near-infrared hyperspectral imaging and chemometrics". Journal of Food Composition and Analysis. 142 107425. doi:10.1016/j.jfca.2025.107425.
- Houngbo, Mahugnon Ezékiel; Desfontaines, Lucienne; Irep, Jean-Luc; Dibi, Konan Evrard Brice; Couchy, Maritza; Otegbayo, Bolanle O.; Cornet, Denis (2024). "Starch granule size and shape characterization of yam ( Dioscorea alata L.) flour using automated image analysis". Journal of the Science of Food and Agriculture. 104 (8): 4680–4688. Bibcode:2024JSFA..104.4680H. doi:10.1002/jsfa.12861. ISSN 0022-5142. PMID 37452681.
- Otegbayo, Bolanle Omolara; Tanimola, Abiola Rebecca; Ricci, Julien; Gibert, Olivier (2024-01-10). "Thermal Properties and Dynamic Rheological Characterization of Dioscorea Starch Gels". Gels. 10 (1): 51. doi:10.3390/gels10010051. ISSN 2310-2861. PMC 10815548. PMID 38247774.

== Marital Life ==
She is married to Professor Jesse Abiodun Otegbayo, and they both have two children.
