= TCNN =

TCNN may refer to:

- Theological College of Northern Nigeria
- Thai Cable News Network
- Television Corporation of NewNight Malaysian TV station
