= Tunde Adeleye =

Anglican bishop in Nigeria

Tunde Adeleye, the former Diocesan Bishop of Calabar, was the immediate past Archbishop of the Anglican Province of the Niger Delta, one of 14 within the Church of Nigeria.

His past posts include:

- President, Christian Union, Mid-Western Polytechnic
- President, Christian Union University of Calabar
- National coordinator, Nigeria Christian Graduate Fellowship
- Chairman, Haggai Institute for Advanced Leadership Training
- Chairman, Christian Council of Nigeria
- Chaplain, All Saints Chapel, University of Benin
- Chairman, Divine Commonwealth Conference
