= Theological College of Northern Nigeria =

Coordinates: 9°47′53.04″N 8°52′52.90″E

- Type: Private
- Affiliations: University of Jos
- Location: Bukuru, Plateau State, Nigeria

Theological College of Northern Nigeria (TCNN) is a private, Christian college located in Bukuru, Plateau State, Nigeria.

== History ==
TCNN was constituted on November 26, 1958, and came into being in February 1959 when classes started at Gindiri. TCNN moved to its permanent site at Bukuru and was dedicated in 1961. TCNN started with two programmes, the Diploma of Theology and Certificate in Theology (now Diploma in Christian Ministry).

TEKAN was founded by the National Daughter Churches of the Sudan United Mission and the Church of the Brethren Mission. In 1980 the college started a Bachelor of Divinity programme along with the other two programmes. In September 1991 the college began to offer master's degrees in theology.

The college is overseen by Tarayar Ekklesiyoyin Kristi a Nigeria" (TEKAN, The Fellowship of the Churches of Christ in Nigeria). TEKAN is made up of eleven denominations found mostly in the northern part of the country. It is these denominations, which are the proprietors of the college, along with the Anglican Dioceses of Nigeria and the Presbyterian Church, which are associate members of that proprietorship.

=== Proprietors ===
- Ekklesiyar Yan'uwa a Nigeria (EYN)
- Christian Reformed Church of Nigeria (CRCN)
- Mambila Baptist Convention (MBC)
- Lutheran Church of Christ in Nigeria (LCCN)
- Nigeria Reformed Church (NRC)
- Church of Christ in Nations (COCIN)
- Evangelical Reformed Church of Christ (ERCC)
- Nongo U Kristu ken Sudan hen Tiv (NKST)
- United Methodist Church in Nigeria (UMCN)
- Haddiyar Ekklesiyar Kristi a Nigeria, Kaduna (HEKAN)
- Evangelical Church of Christ in Nigeria (ECCN)

=== Associates ===
- Anglican Province of Nigeria
- Presbyterian Church of Nigeria

== Campus ==
The chapel is the dominant feature of the campus and the center of campus life. The college is situated 2 km east of Bukuru near Jos. Jos, the Plateau State capital city, is 15 km from the college. The tree-lined campus lies at the foot of a rocky hill. The setting is both beautiful and quiet — ideal for studying. The college occupies about 40 hectares (100 acres) of land. The main and original site contains 15 staff houses and two blocks of rooms for single students with kitchen area and students' lounge. In the married students' quarters there are 62 houses. Other buildings are the Women's School, Carpentry Workshop, Dispensary, Chapel, Library, an administrative block containing offices for the Provost, Deputy Provost, Academic Dean, Administrative Officers, Bursar, Registrar and Secretaries, an ACTS bookshop, classroom blocks with an assembly hall and a supplies room.

The College has a nursery and a primary school for children of staff and students. To qualify for the lower fees, the children must be the parents' own blood children. Children from the neighbourhood are also admitted. The college also has a day and boarding secondary school for the children of staff, those from the area around the college, and from the outlying areas of Bukuru and Jos.

== Academic information ==
From its inception, TCNN has offered certificates and diplomas in theology. In 1980 TCNN began to offer a Bachelor of Divinity degree (BDD) in affiliation with the University of Jos. In 1991 TCNN began to offer a Master of Theology (MTH) with the intention of being affiliated with the University of Jos.

Since 1980, the Theological College of Northern Nigeria has been affiliated with the University of Jos. It is recognised not only by TEKAN but also by many other church denominations as an excellent institution for the training of future ministers, both academically and spiritually.

At present, there are about 300 students at the college.
