= Catholic Secretariat of Nigeria =

- Abbreviation: CSN
- Formation: 1956 (established); 1958 (legally incorporated)
- Founded at: Nigeria
- Type: Administrative organ of the Catholic Bishops' Conference of Nigeria
- Headquarters: Abuja, Nigeria
- Location: Plot 459, Cadastral Zone B2, Southern Parkway, Durumi 1, Abuja
- Region served: Nigeria
- Members: Roman Catholic Church in Nigeria (all dioceses)
- Secretary General: Very Rev. Fr. Dr. Michael Ayanleke Banjo
- President of CBCN: Most Rev. Matthew Man-Oso Ndagoso
- Main organ: Catholic Bishops' Conference of Nigeria (CBCN)
- Affiliations: Christian Association of Nigeria (one of five blocs)
- Website: csnigeria.org

The Catholic Secretariat of Nigeria (CSN) is the administrative headquarters and coordinating body of the Catholic Bishops' Conference of Nigeria (CBCN). It serves as the central organ for implementing the decisions of the CBCN and facilitating the missionary, educational, pastoral, and human development activities of the Catholic Church in Nigeria.

== History ==
The Catholic Secretariat of Nigeria was established in 1956 as the administrative arm of the Catholic Bishops in Nigeria. It was legally recognised and incorporated as a corporate body in 1958.

Headquartered in Abuja, the CSN operates through various departments that support the work of bishops, priests, religious orders, and the laity. It has grown to become the key institution through which the Catholic Church in Nigeria coordinates its national-level activities, including social services, advocacy, education, and response to national issues.

== Activities ==
The CSN engages in advocacy on issues of national concern, including peacebuilding, social justice, human rights, security, and good governance. It coordinates charitable works through departments such as Church and Society (which oversees Caritas Nigeria), Pastoral Affairs, Social Communications, Education, Health, Family and Human Life, and others.

The Secretariat organizes national programs, leadership retreats, seminars, and empowerment initiatives. It also responds to crises such as insecurity, displacement, and humanitarian needs affecting communities in Nigeria.

== Leadership ==
The Catholic Secretariat of Nigeria is headed by a Secretary-General, a priest appointed by the Catholic Bishops' Conference of Nigeria (CBCN) to manage day-to-day operations and implement the decisions of the bishops. The President of the CBCN provides overall episcopal leadership to the Church in Nigeria, with the Secretariat serving as its executive arm. As of 2026, the Secretary-General is Very Rev. Fr. Dr. Michael Ayanleke Banjo and the President of the CBCN is Most Rev. Matthew Man-Oso Ndagoso, Archbishop of Kaduna.

=== Past Secretaries-General ===
Since its inception, the CSN has had thirteen Secretaries-General. The documented list includes:

#	Name	Years
1	Most Rev. Edmund Joseph Fitzgibbon	1960–1963
2	Rev. Fr. L. Carr	1963–1967
3	Most Rev. Brian David Usanga	1967–1970
4	Most Rev. Alexius O. Makozi	1970–1972
5	Most Rev. Gabriel Ganaka	1972–1974
6	Most Rev. Msgr. A. E. Obine	1974–1979
7	Rt. Rev. Msgr. Raphael C. Anasiudu	1979–1985
8	Rt. Rev. Msgr. John N. Ogbonna	1985–1994
9	Most Rev. Dr Matthew Hassan Kukah	1994–2000
10	Very Rev. Fr. George Ehusani	2000–2006
11	Rt. Rev. Msgr. Michael Otto Ekpenyong	2006–2012
12	Rt Rev. Msgr. Ralph Okechukwu Madu	2012–2018
13	Very Rev. Fr Zacharia Nyantiso Samjumi	2019-2025

== Relationship with Christian Association of Nigeria ==
The CSN represents the Roman Catholic Church as one of the five major blocs within the Christian Association of Nigeria (CAN), alongside the Christian Council of Nigeria (CCN), Pentecostal Fellowship of Nigeria (PFN), Organisation of African Instituted Churches (OAIC), and the Evangelical Church Winning All / Fellowship of Churches of Christ in Nigeria. It participates in national Christian advocacy while maintaining the distinct hierarchical structure of the Catholic Church.

== See also ==
- Catholic Bishops' Conference of Nigeria
- Catholic Church in Nigeria
- Christian Association of Nigeria
- Christianity in Nigeria
- List of Catholic dioceses in Nigeria
