= Ezekiel Dachomo =

Nigerian preacher

Reverend Ezekiel Dachomo

Regional Chairman Church of Christ in Nations, Barkin Ladi LGA

Personal life
- Born: Ezekiel Bwede Dachomo
- Known for: Advocacy on Christian persecution in Plateau State; criticisms of Nigerian government; Documenting communal violence
- Occupation: Pastor human rights advocate

Religious life
- Church: Church of Christ in Nations (COCIN)

Senior posting
- Residence: Plateau State, Nigeria

Ezekiel Bwede Dachomo (also spelled "Dachumo" in some sources) is a Nigerian Reverend Christian pastor, activist of human rights, and preacher in Plateau State.

He is best known for his outspoken activism on behalf of Christian communities that have suffered violence in Nigeria, particularly in the Middle Belt region, and his criticisms of the Nigerian government and security agencies.

== Ministry ==
He is a senior cleric in the Church of Christ in Nations (COCIN), serving as the regional chairman for the Barkin Ladi local government area in Plateau State.

In some reports, he is associated with Kingdom Gospel Mission International.

Dachomo gained national attention in Nigeria for his activism relating to communal violence, particularly in Plateau State. He became widely known after videos circulated online showing him conducting mass burials for Christians killed in what he described as a Christian genocide. The footage went viral, drawing significant public interest and reportedly attracting attention from international audiences, including in the United States, Nicki Minaj, and President Donald Trump, who placed Nigeria as a Country of Particular Concern. In an interview on November 19, 2025 with British journalist Piers Morgan, Dachomo stated that he had presided over more than 70 mass burials, sometimes burying over 500 people in a single night, and accused the Nigerian government of downplaying the violence.

His outspoken comments led to sanctions from the social media platform Facebook and the subsequent removal of his account.

== Advocacy and public role ==
- He has publicly spoken of what he describes as a "Christian genocide" in parts of plateau and northern Nigeria, alleging that extremist Fulani militants target Christian communities.
- He has called on international bodies to intervene, including threatening to take the Nigerian government to the International Criminal Court (ICC) over the violence.
- After recording and publicizing mass burials of victims of attacks, he has said that many of these violence events are underreported.

== Death threats and alleged assassination attempt ==
In October 2025, Dachomo publicly stated that his life was in "grave danger" due to death threats. He said the threats came through phone calls, text messages, and social media, particularly after he shared a video documenting a mass burial in Plateau State, which he claimed showed evidence of a "Christian genocide." Dachomo also said that during mass burials the threats intensified, and he no longer sleeps fearlessly.

In one of his more warnings, he told his followers that if he were ever kidnapped, they should not pay any ransom. He said in a viral video that his death would "raise war" and help liberate Christians.

A post attributed to the collective Anonymous allegedly circulated among militants and bandits, calling for his assassination within seven days. According to the message, his photos were shared and orders were given to "kill him and cut his head off."

In response to the threats, Major General E.F. Oyinlola, commander of the Joint Task Force Operation Enduring Peace (OPEP) visited Dachomo and publicly pledged military protection. At the same time, a group of Fulani called Plateau Fulani Like-Minds (PFL) denied any plot against him. In a statement, they opined that Dachomo exaggerated the threats to seek relevance, and challenged him to produce the names of those allegedly threatening him.

On 28 November 2025, Dachomo claimed that Boko Haram had placed a bounty on his life in retaliation for his criticism of the group. He said he had credible information about the threat and added that some individuals linked to Tinubu had also warned him to stop posting such videos. In response to the video, a United States Representative, Riley Moore, threatened the Nigerian Government, stating that they will be held responsible for any harm that happens to Dachomo.
