= Nigerian Christian Pilgrim Commission =

Agency overview
- Formed: 28 May 2007
- Preceding agency: Nigerian Pilgrims Board (re-organized)
- Jurisdiction: Nigeria
- Headquarters: Abuja, Nigeria
- Agency executive: Rt. Rev. (Prof.) Stephen Tunde Victor Adegbite, Executive Secretary
- Parent agency: Federal Government of Nigeria
- Child agency: State Christian Pilgrims Welfare Boards
- Website: www.ncpc.gov.ng

The Nigerian Christian Pilgrim Commission (NCPC) is a statutory body of the Federal Government of Nigeria established to regulate, coordinate, and supervise Christian pilgrimage activities from Nigeria to holy sites worldwide, primarily Jerusalem, Jordan, and other Christian pilgrimage destinations.

== History ==
The NCPC was established by the Nigerian Christian Pilgrim Commission Act 2007 (Act No. 74 of 2007), which commenced on 28 May 2007. The Act reorganised the role of the Federal Government in Christian pilgrimage matters and repealed the earlier Nigerian Pilgrims Act of 1989. It created the commission as a body corporate with perpetual succession to license, regulate, perform oversight, and provide supervisory functions over Christian pilgrimage operations.

Prior to the 2007 Act, pilgrimage coordination was handled under older frameworks. The NCPC was formally set up during the administration of President Olusegun Obasanjo to bring structure, transparency, and welfare focus to Christian pilgrimages.

== Mandate and functions ==
The core functions of the NCPC, as outlined in the 2007 Act, include:

- Licensing and regulating pilgrimage operators and service providers.
- Coordinating the airlifting and welfare of Nigerian Christian pilgrims to holy sites.
- Supervising state Christian Pilgrims Welfare Boards.
- Ensuring hitch-free pilgrimage exercises through enhanced welfare, security, and logistical support.
- Promoting responsible leadership and accountability in pilgrimage administration.
- Exploring and certifying additional holy sites (e.g., initiatives for sites in Turkey and others).

The commission works in collaboration with state governments, airlines, hotels, and international partners to facilitate annual pilgrimages, often to Israel and Jordan.

== Leadership ==
The NCPC is headed by an Executive Secretary, who serves as the chief executive and accounting officer. As of 2026, the Executive Secretary is Rt. Rev. (Prof.) Stephen Tunde Victor Adegbite, a bishop of the Methodist Church Nigeria, who was appointed by President Bola Tinubu in January 2024. He also serves as Chaplain of the Aso Rock Villa Chapel.

The commission has a Board comprising a chairman, the Executive Secretary, six Federal Commissioners, and six ex-officio members.

== Activities ==
The NCPC organises annual Christian pilgrimages, issues Jerusalem Pilgrim (JP) certificates, licenses operators, and conducts pre-visit retreats and medical screenings. The commission has also explored expanding pilgrimage destinations and collaborated on interfaith and national development initiatives.

In recent years, it has successfully coordinated large-scale pilgrimages to Israel and Jordan while addressing security concerns that occasionally lead to suspensions or adjustments.

== Relationship with state bodies ==
The NCPC oversees and collaborates with State Christian Pilgrims Welfare Boards, which handle grassroots screening and mobilisation of intending pilgrims at the state level.

== See also ==
- Christian Association of Nigeria
- Christianity in Nigeria
- Christian Pilgrims Welfare Board
