= Christian Pilgrims Welfare Board =

The Christian Pilgrims Welfare Board (RSCPWB) is a government-funded body that screens, organizes and accompanies the intending pilgrims of Rivers State to the Holy Lands of Israel and Rome. The board works in consonance with the Nigerian Christian Pilgrim Commission (NCPC). It is governed by a Sole Administrator, an Executive Secretary and other members who are all appointees of the Governor. The current Sole Administrator as of June 2014 is John Wangbu.

== See also ==
- List of government agencies of Rivers State
