= Reformed Church of Christ for Nations =

Reformed Church of Christ for the Nations
- Classification: Protestant
- Orientation: Reformed
- Theology: Calvinist
- Polity: Presbyterian
- Associations: Sudan United Mission, Christian Reformed Church of North America, World Communion of Reformed Churches and World Council of Churches
- Origin: 1973
- Separated from: Christian Reformed Church of Nigeria
- Congregations: 132 (2024)
- Members: 100,000 (2024)

The Reformed Church of Christ for Nations (RCCN) is a Reformed Christian denomination based in Nigeria, formed in 1993 by a group of churches that broke away from the Christian Reformed Church of Nigeria.

== History ==
The Christian Reformed Church of Nigeria (ICRN) was founded in the 20th century by missionaries from the Sudan United Mission and Christian Reformed Church in North America.

In 1973, a group of churches, mostly made up of members of the Kuteb tribe, broke away from the ICRN and formed the Church of Christ in Nigeria, or Ekklesia Kristi A Nigeria.

In 1993, the synod decided to change the name to Christ Reformed Church in Nigeria to better reflect its national identity and Reformed tradition.

Eventually, the denomination changed its name again to Reformed Church of Christ for the Nations.

== Doctrine and organization ==
The RCCN endorses the Apostles' Creed, Nicene Creed, Heidelberg Catechism, Canons of Dort, and Westminster Confession of Faith. Church governance is structured on three levels: local council, district council and synod, which meets twice a year.

In the 2020s church members were attacked and killed in several Islamic terrorism events.

== Statistics ==
According to data from the World Council of Churches, in 2016 the RCCN was made up of approximately 250,000 members and 64 pastors.

However, in a survey conducted by the Christian Reformed Church in North America, in 2024, the RCCN reported having 100,000 members, in 132 congregations.

== Ecumenical affiliations ==
The RCCN is a member of the World Communion of Reformed Churches and of the World Council of Churches.

Additionally, the denomination has full communion with the Christian Reformed Church in North America.
