= Thomas Jefferson Bowen =

American missionary to Nigeria (1814–1875)

Thomas Jefferson Bowen (1814–1875) was an American expatriate Baptist missionary who spent considerable time of his missionary activities in Ijaye, Ogbomosho and a few other towns within the present Oyo State. His work established the foundation of the Baptist mission in Nigeria. Bowen's intention to proselytize to Africans in the interior in particular the Fulanis was stopped by the Emir of Ilorin, Bowen then concentrated his effort in Yorubaland until his return to America. While in the U.S., he began to promote the creation of an America colony of free blacks in Africa.

== Life ==
Bowen was born in Jackson County, Georgia. As a 22-year-old, he had experience in the quelling of a Native American uprising in Georgia and participated in the second Seminole War. Thereafter, he volunteered to join Texas in their independence fight against Mexico. It was during his stay in Texas that Bowen found Christ, upon his return to Georgia, he began to preaching and was soon ordained a minister. Bowen's church was affiliated with the American Baptist Mission but after a split in 1845, his allegiance shifted to the Southern Baptist Convention (SBC). In 1848, when Bowen began to map out his vision of missionary activities in the interior of West Africa, the SBC was already involved in missionary work in China, India and in Liberia but the existing mission in Liberia was not promising, the Triennial Convention's missionary effort on the West African coast sent fifteen white missionaries but nine died and the remainder returned to Boston.Bowen canvassed for a mission in the African interior of Central Africa or Western Sudan which constitutes present day Northern West Africa as a region more receptive to foreign missionaries. He had basic but limited knowledge of West Africa mostly from information he read about the activities of European explorers obtained from reference works from Penny cyclopaedia and Chamber's miscellany. Bowen also befriended W.B. Hodgson, a fellow Georgia native who had written works about the Berbers and Fulani's of Northern and Western Africa. Igboho was planned to be the starting point of his missionary work in Africa because it was close to the Fulani empire, converting the Fulani's was thought to be critical to spread Christianity in West Africa.

Upon approval from the mission board of SBC, Bowen and two other colleagues Robert Hill and Hervey Goodale proceeded to Africa in December 1849, in early 1850, the group reached the shores of Liberia en route to Badagry and further into Yorubaland. After arrival in Liberia, Bowen spent four months in Monrovia waiting for permission for movement to Badagry, during this time, Goodale died and Hill and Bowen went their separate ways. When he finally reached Badagry, Bowen was unable to go to Igboho due to civil war within Yorubaland. From Badagry he moved to Abeokuta and lived with European Methodist and Anglican missionaries such as Henry Townsend. At Abeokuta, he bidded time studying Yoruba language and also giving military advice to the Egba in their war with Dahomey. He also visited some Yoruba chiefs in present-day Ibarapa and received a warm welcome at Ijaye where he established a station with the support of Aare Kurunmi. While in Yorubaland, Bowen's suffered from intermittent fever and his health deteriorated. He returned to America in 1852 to recuperate and to seek additional support for the mission. Bowen spent about a year in America, where he lobbied for support of the mission in Yorubaland and also got married. In 1853, he set sail for Ijaye with his new wife and two other missionary couples.

At Ijaye, Bowen and his wife built a chapel and established another outpost at Ogbomoso. However, Bowen's plan to move further north and convert the Fulani's was rebuffed by the ruling Emir of Ilorin who denied Bowen permission to preach in the city or to move further northwards with Ilorin's protection. in 1856, Bowen returned to America.

In 1857, Bowen published an account of his mission work, which also narrated his views on how the Christian world can transform Africa. The book received attention from American's interested in African affairs and from the American Colonization Society, who were already familiar with Bowen, a frequent contributor to the society's journal, American repository.
