= Bukky Abaniwonda =

Canadian actress of Nigerian descent

- Born: Bukky Abaniwonda; Canada
- Other name: Bukky Wonder
- Education: Bowen University
- Occupation: Actress
- Years active: 2015–present

Bukky Abaniwonda, popularly called Bukky Wonder, is a Canadian actress of Nigerian descent, who is best known for the films Bridges, Awkward Things About Losing Weight and The Carperdian.

== Personal life ==
She was born in Canada as the second of the family with five siblings. She spent her childhood in Abuja. She has two brothers and two sisters. She attended Command Day Secondary School, Abuja for high school studies. Then she graduated with an accounting degree from Bowen University.

== Career ==
In 2017, she played the lead role in the film Bridges directed by Rogers Ofime. Then she acted in the film It's The End.

In 2020, Abaniwonda directed the first Afro-Canadian web serial The African Family which is almost exclusively an all-Black production. It has been shot in Calgary. The cast included African actors from Nigeria, Congo and Angola.
