= Christian Association of Nigeria =

Organization of Christian denominations in Nigeria

- Abbreviation: CAN
- Classification: Christianity
- Scripture: Bible
- Structure: Non-denominational
- President: Daniel Okoh
- Associations: Christian Council of Nigeria, Catholic Secretariat of Nigeria, Pentecostal Fellowship of Nigeria, Organisation of African Instituted Churches, Fellowship of Churches of Christ in Nigeria
- Region: Nigeria
- Origin: 1976
- Official website: CAN Website
- Slogan: That they all may be one. John 17:21

The Christian Association of Nigeria (CAN) is an umbrella organisation containing numerous Christian denominations in Nigeria.

== History ==
The Christian Association of Nigeria was founded in 1976, and originally only contained the Catholic Church and mainline Protestant groups. However, it later expanded to include Pentecostal churches as well.

In 2000, the CAN protested the adoption of Sharia law in northern states. In February 2006, while President of the organisation, Akinola issued a statement in response to Muslim violence against Christians, telling Muslims that they did not have a "monopoly on violence". The following day, Christians rioted in retaliation against Muslims, leading to more than 70 deaths. Akinola later claimed his statements had been misinterpreted in the western media. He even threatened to resign in case the riots should continue.

On 2 May 2004, more than 630 Christians were killed in Yelwa, Nigeria. The dead were pinned white name tags identifying them as members of the CAN. The massacre is known as the Yelwa massacre.

== Organisation ==
The organisation is made up of five blocs; they are the Christian Council of Nigeria, the Catholic Secretariat of Nigeria, the Pentecostal Fellowship of Nigeria, Organisation of African Instituted Churches and the Evangelical Church Winning All/Fellowship of Churches of Christ in Nigeria.

The CAN has Women and Youth Wings, a National Executive Council consisting of 105 members (which elects the President), and a General Assembly of 304 members (which ratifies the President's election).

== Leadership ==
In 2016, Supo Ayokunle, President (and Chief Executive Officer) of The Nigerian Baptist Convention, was elected as president and Prof. Joseph Otubu, of the Motailatu Church Cherubim and Seraphim Movement, the Vice President.

Ayokunle was re-elected for second term and inaugurated in July 2019 alongside his Vice President Rev Dr. Caleb Ahima. In July 2022, Daniel Okoh was elected as the present president of the association

Order	Term of Office	Tenure Served	Name	Place of Birth	Denomination	Notes
1	November 1988 - November 1995	2 re-elected 1992	Anthony Cardinal Okogie	Lagos, Nigeria	Roman Catholic	Archbishop of Lagos
2	November 1995 - November 2003	2 re-elected 1999	Sunday Mbang	Akwa Ibom, Nigeria	Methodist	Prelate of the Methodist Church of Nigeria
3	November 2003 - June 2007	1	Peter Akinola	Ogun, Nigeria	Anglican	Primate, Anglican Church of Nigeria
4	June 2007 - July 2010	1	Archbishop John Onaiyekan	Kabba, Nigeria	Roman Catholic	Archbishop of Abuja
5	July 2010 - July 2016	2 re-elected 2013	Ayo Oritsejafor	Warri, Nigeria	Pentecostal	Pastor, Word of Life Bible Church
6	July 2016 – July 2022	2 re-elected	Supo Ayokunle	Oyo, Nigeria	Baptist	President, Nigerian Baptist Convention
7	July 2022 - till date	Incumbent	Daniel Okoh	Kano, Nigeria	Pentecostal	General Supretendent, Christ Holy Church International

== See also ==
- Pentecostal Fellowship of Nigeria
