= Ayo Oritsejafor =

Founder of Word of Life Bible Church in Warri, Nigeria

Pastor Ayo Oritsejafor
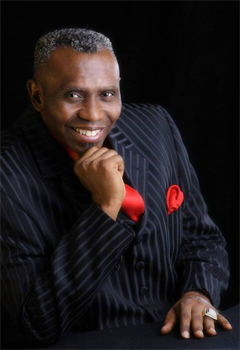

5th President of CAN
- In office July 2010 – July 2016
- Vice President: Daniel Okoh
- Preceded by: John Onaiyekan
- Succeeded by: Supo Ayokunle

5th President of PFN
- In office 2007–2013
- Deputy: Felix Omobude
- Preceded by: Mike Okonkwo
- Succeeded by: Felix Omobude

Personal details
- Born: Ayodele Joseph Oritsegbubemi Oritsejafor
- Spouse: Helen Oritsejafor (m. 1997)
- Occupation: Preacher, author
- Website: Ayo Oritsejafor Ministries

Ayodele Joseph Oritsegbubemi Oritsejafor, known as Papa Ayo Oritsejafor, is the founding and senior pastor of Word of Life Bible Church, located in Warri, Nigeria. He became the national president of the Pentecostal Fellowship of Nigeria (PFN) on 7 February 2007, a position he held for six years. In July 2010, Oritsejafor was elected President of the Christian Association of Nigeria.

== Early life ==
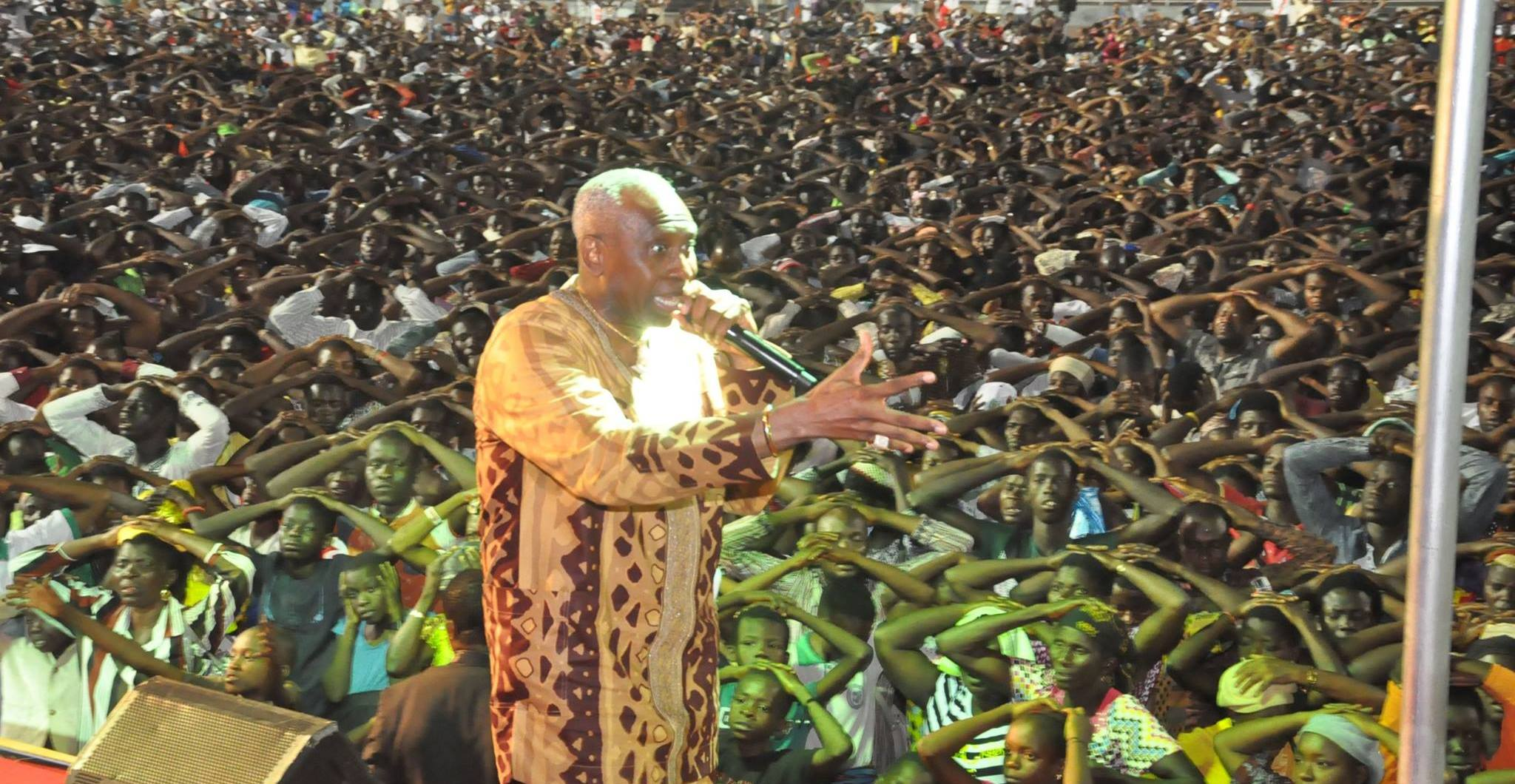
Oritsejafor ministering at the Warri Miracle Crusade in the Warri City Stadium, December 10, 2015

In 1972, Oritsejafor became "born again" in an evangelical crusade held in Sapele. He enrolled at the All Nations for Christ Bible Institute in Benin City, Nigeria. He later enrolled with the Nigerian Baptist Seminary, Ogbomosho in Oyo State and in 1979 left for the United States for further studies at Morris Cerullo's School of Ministry (El Cortez), San Diego, California.

Oritsejafor is a proponent of leadership by example. This is evident in the role he played in bringing the crisis in Niger Delta area of Nigeria to an end.

== Philanthropy ==
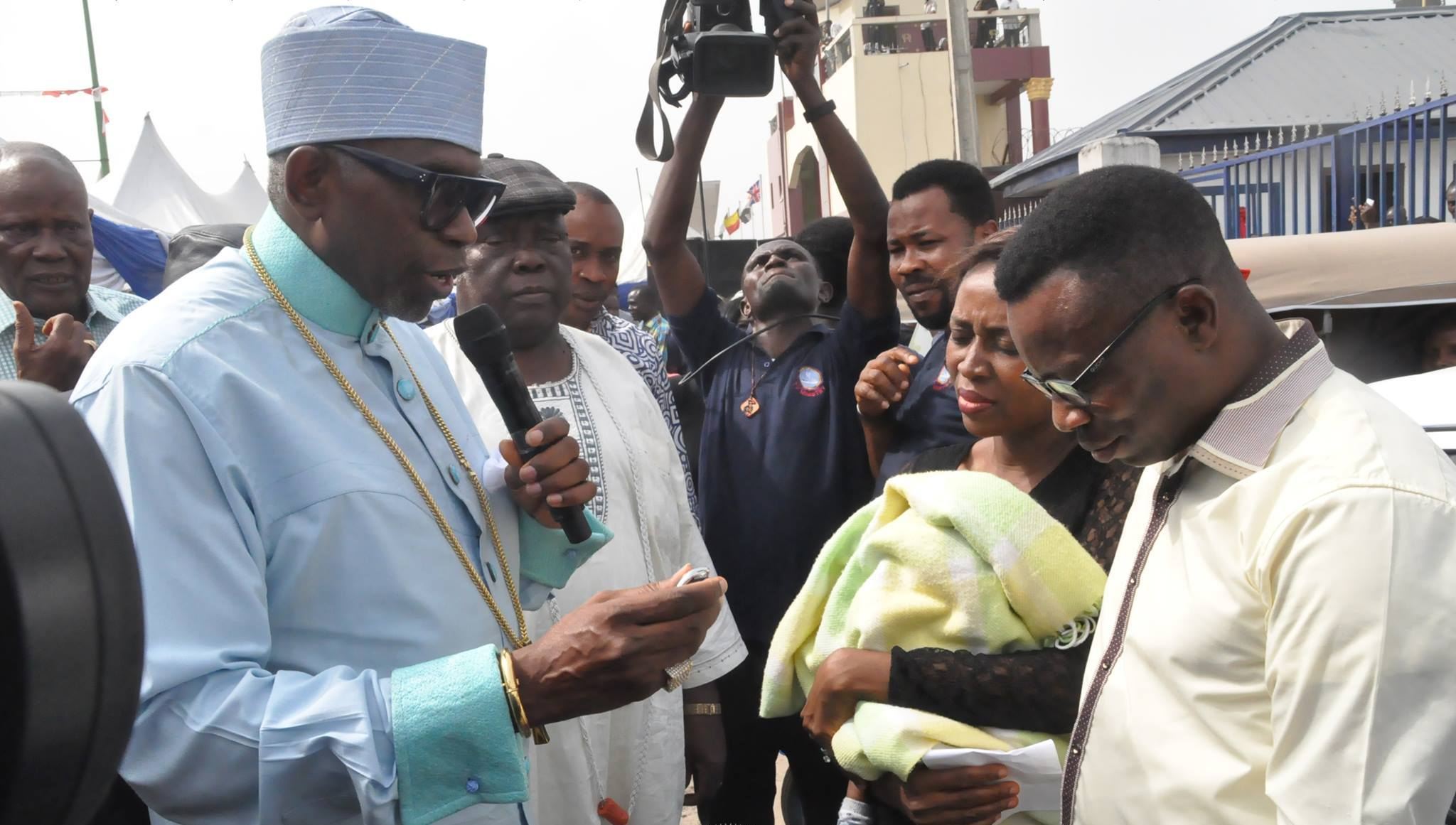
Oritsejafor with a benefactor during the Annual Poverty Alleviation Program in Warri, Nigeria on December 26, 2015

Oritsejafor identifies himself as a servant of God and a vessel through which God ministers to the spiritual and physical needs of people. His ministry emphasizes salvation, repentance, holiness, deliverance, and empowerment of the less privileged through social responsibility programs. He has condemned wastefulness and advocated for giving back to society, irrespective of religion or race.

Oritsejafor provides scholarships to underprivileged students in various tertiary, secondary, and elementary institutions both within and outside Nigeria, regardless of tribe or denomination.

In December 2005, Oritsejafor and his wife, Helen, partnered with the Flight Microfinance Bank to start an empowerment programme for the people. Oritsejafor, ever since, made it a tradition to empower the less privileged to alleviate the suffering of families at the end of every December.

On 26 December 2016, the Word of Life Bible Church in conjunction with the Eagle Flight Micro Finance Bank held the poverty alleviation programme in Warri.

=== African Broadcasting Network (ABN) ===
Oritsejafor set up the African Broadcasting Network, an international satellite Christian television station intended to spread the gospel of Christ from Africa to the world. ABN is a satellite channel broadcasting from London and covering Africa, parts of Asia and parts of Europe.

== Recognition ==
On May 9, 2013, Oritsejafor received an award of 'A True Servant of God' by The Northern States Christian Elders Forum (NOSCEF). Matthew Owojaiye, Chairman of NOSCEF, said that Oritsejafor was chosen "because of his commitment and dedication for the things of Christ, noting that when others tried to save their head, he dared to speak the truth."

== Christian Association of Nigeria (CAN) ==
In 2010, Oritsejafor was declared the National President of the Christian Association of Nigeria (CAN). He has been called the "most misunderstood" President of CAN. He was re-elected as the president on July 10, 2013. A CAN Official praised Oritsejafor:

If people need to celebrate any man, it is this man because he has lifted the profile of the Christian Association of Nigeria. Before, people talk down on CAN, today you don't just talk down on CAN without CAN responding. That is a very huge achievement. One of the greatest achievements that he has done which has never ever happened before in the history of CAN, there has never been any President of CAN who interfaced with all the different blocs of CAN, and there is no bloc that can say the CAN President has not come either physically to worship with them or participated in one of their projects. Do you know that some of the Christian leaders that were killed, like some pastors in Maiduguri, he gave them accommodation, gave their children scholarship.

Oritsejafor came up with the idea of a Jubilee Centre to generate funds for the association: a 50–bedroom structure with a large conference hall. The Jubilee Centre, National Christian Center, Abuja, was completed and opened in 2015 by President Goodluck Jonathan.

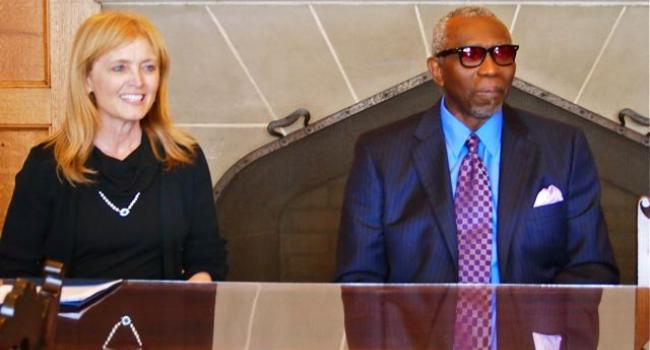
USCIRF Chair Katrina Swett with CAN President Oritsejafor, June 2012
