= Anglican Diocese of Calabar =

Anglican diocese in Nigeria

The Anglican Diocese of Calabar is one of ten dioceses within the Anglican Province of the Niger Delta, itself one of 14 ecclesiastical provinces within the Church of Nigeria. The current bishop is the Rt. Rev. Nneoyi Egbe while the immediate past bishop was Right Rev. Tunde Adeleye, who was also Archbishop of the Province.
