= Reverend M.O Dada =

Reverend Moses Odutola Dada, OBE was born in Ago-Iwoye, Ogun State, Nigeria. He was the first African head of the Methodist Church (first African Methodist Bishop) in Nigeria (Methodist Church of Nigeria), the Very Reverend M.O. Dada served at Methodist Church, Olowogbowo, Lagos.

The Methodist Primary School, Ibese was founded in the year 1922 by the late Reverend M. O. Dada, as a missionary school by Methodist church, Ibese.

In the King's Birthday Honours 1951 he was made an Officer of the Order of the British Empire (Civil Division) by King George VI.

== Legacy ==
The Methodist Primary School, Ibese.

Moses Odutola Dada Hostel donated by Sir Olaniwun Ajayi and Lady Adunola Ajayi Foundation.
