= Presbyterian Church of Nigeria =

Protestant church in Nigeria

- Classification: Protestant
- Orientation: Reformed
- Theology: Calvinist
- Polity: Presbyterian
- Associations: World Council of Churches, All Africa Conference of Churches, Christian Council of Nigeria, World Communion of Reformed Churches
- Region: Nigeria
- Origin: 1846
- Branched from: United Presbyterian Church of Scotland
- Congregations: 2,000
- Members: 5,800,000 (2019)
- Official website: www.presbyterianchurchng.com

The Presbyterian Church of Nigeria is a church in Nigeria and subscribes to the Westminster Confession of Faith.

The denomination had twenty-nine synods, about 110 presbyteries, over 5,000 parishes, almost 5,000 ministers, and about 7,000,000 members across the country. Presently the General Assembly Executive Committee (GAEC) approved the inauguration of more synods for the spread of God's word.

== History ==
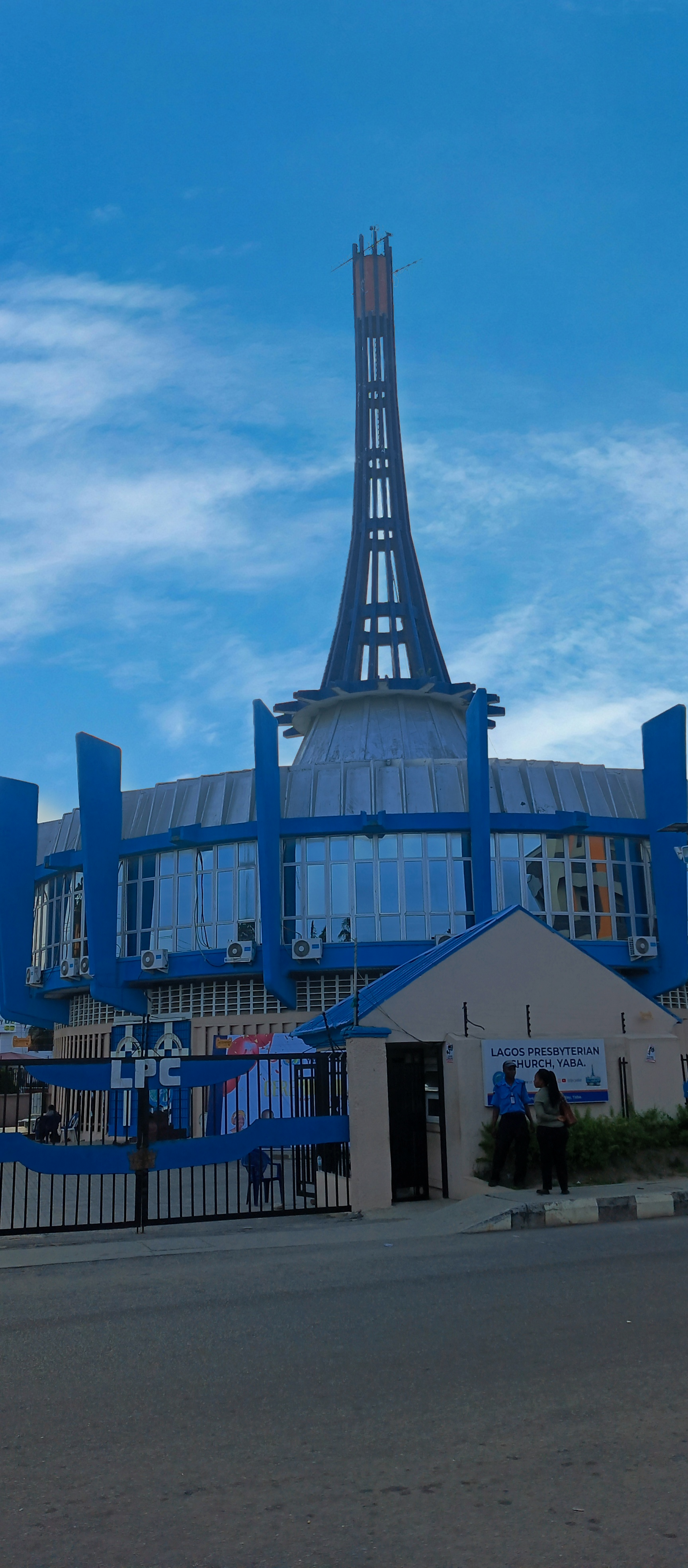
Presbyterian Church in Lagos, Nigeria.

The Presbyterian Church of Nigeria was founded by missionaries led by Reverend Masterson Waddell Hope of the United Presbyterian Church of Scotland. He arrived in Calabar and founded the first Presbyterian church in 1846. From Calabar the church began to grow. In 1858 the Presbytery of Biafra was formed. The Synod of Biafra was formed in 1921.

The church developed rapidly when the "Presbyterian Church of Biafra" established the Synod as its highest court. The church became independent from then on and was called the "Presbyterian Church in Eastern Nigeria" in 1952. On June 16, 1960, it became known as the Presbyterian Church of Nigeria. In 1987, the General Assembly was constituted with two Synods. During this period the church received missionaries from the Church of Scotland and the Presbyterian Church of Jamaica (currently the United Church in Jamaica and the Cayman Islands).

The denomination began establishing a seminary in 1993, which gave rise to "Waddell Hope University". The University is located in Okagwe Ohafia in the state of Abia. Its motto is "Excellence, integrity and service". The church has two highly regarded theological institutions: the Hugh Goldie Lay Institute of Theological Training, founded in 1918, and the Assien Ukpabio Presbyterian Theological College, founded in 1994.

In 1996, the denomination already had over 1 million members, 200 parishes, organized into 28 Presbyteries, 4 Synods, and a General Assembly.

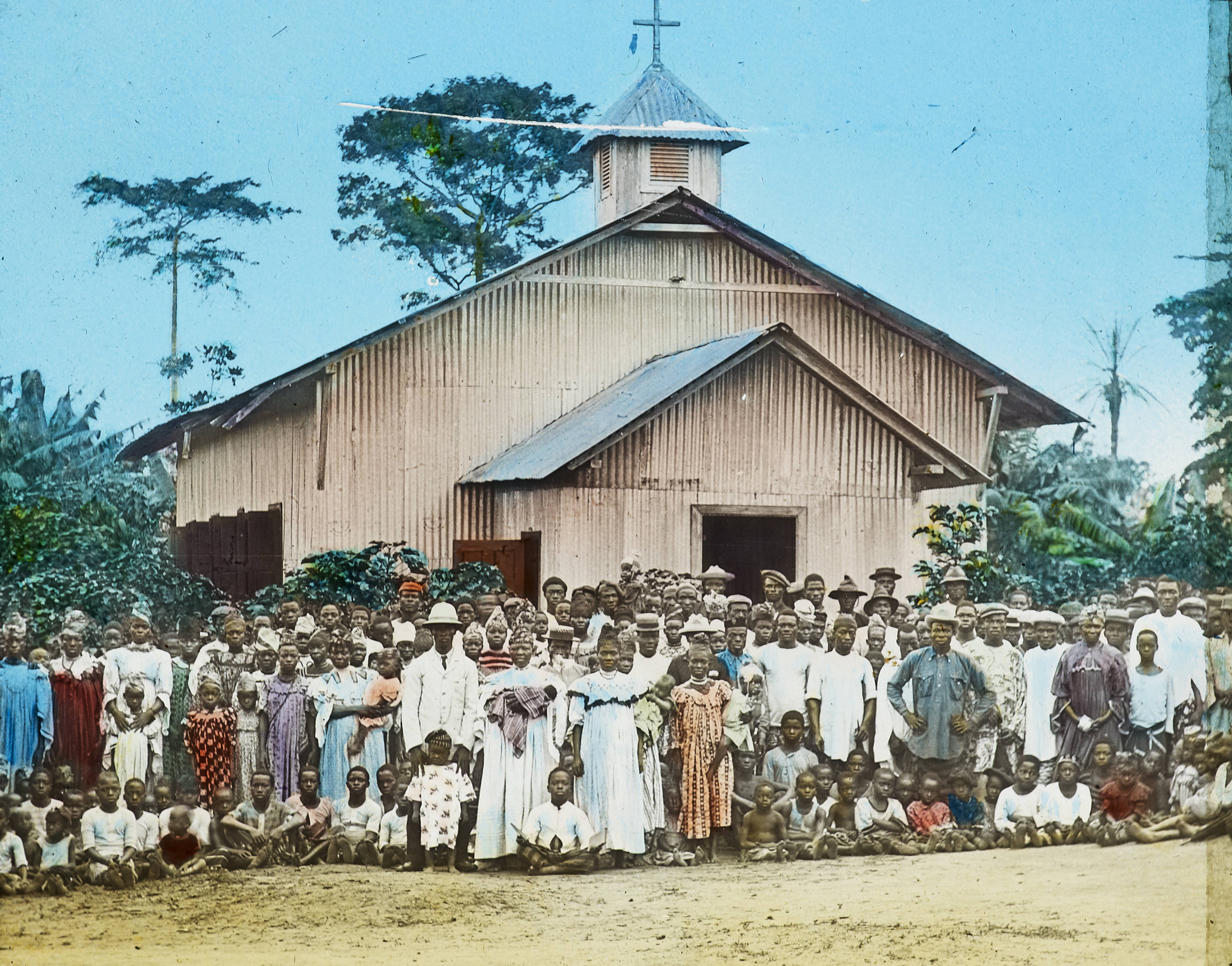
Presbyterian Church in Nigeria

The church has spread throughout northern Nigeria in recent decades where many churches have suffered violent attacks from Boko Haram.

In 2011 a schism occurred and the Reformed Presbyterian Church of Nigeria was formed due to governmental issues. Part of the East-Central Synod broke away and formed the new denomination. This year, the church had nine synods, more than 50 presbyteries, more than 2,000 congregations, nearly 7,000 ministers, and 3,806,690 members nationwide.

In 2015, the country's vice president recognized the role of the church in shaping Nigerian society and its missionaries working in the country.

A The denomination grew rapidly in the following years. In 2019, it was reported that the denomination had approximately 5,800,000 members.

The church headquarters are in Ogpor in the state of Abya in southeastern Nigeria.

== Principal officers ==
- His Eminence, Most Rev Prof. Ekpenyong N. Akpanika PhD (Prelate and Moderator of the General Assembly of the Presbyterian Church of Nigeria)
- Most Rev Dr. Miracle Ajah, PhD (Principal Clerk)
- Rev. Aniefiok Victor Ekop (Deputy Clerk)
- Eld. Edet Effiong (G.A Accountant)

== Structure and missions ==
The church has outreaches across the entire country. It has a mission presbytery in the Republics of Benin and Togo. The church structure is the session, presbytery, synod, and general assembly. The parishes have one to nine congregations, depending on the size. The congregations are ruled by elders. Several churches belong to a regional presbytery. Presbyteries belong to a bigger body—the synod. The General Assembly is the supreme court of the church. It is the result of a Scottish mission. It cooperates with the Church of Scotland. Old synods are 10 in number:

- Synod of Akwa
- Synod of Calabar
- Synod of The East
- Synod of East Central
- Synod of Mid East
- Synod of the Niger Delta
- Synod of the North
- Synod of South Central
- Synod of Upper Cross River
- Synod of The West

== 29 new synods of PCN ==
- Abuja Synod
- Abasi Ibom Synod
- Akwa Synod
- Northern Calabar Synod
- Calabar Synod
- Arochukwu Synod
- Ohafia Synod
- East Synod
- Abakaliki Synod
- Enugu Synod
- Anambra Mission Synod
- Niger Delta Synod
- Edo Delta Mission Synod
- North-West Mission Synod
- Abuja Synod
- Benue Mission Synod
- Plateau Mission Synod
- North-East Mission Synod
- Francophone Mission Synod at Cotonou
- Lagos Synod
- Eko Synod
- Ibadan Mission Synod
- Aba Synod
- Umuahia Synod
- Imo Mission Synod
- Upper Cross River South Synod
- Upper Cross River Central Synod
- Ogoja Synod
- Afikpo Synod
- Ohaozara Synod
- Abam Synod

== Theology ==
- Apostles Creed
- Athanasian Creed
- Nicene Creed
- Heidelberg Catechism
- Second Helvetic Confession
- Westminster Confession of Faith

== Theological Schools ==
The Presbyterian Church of Nigeria has two theological institutions; they are Hugh Goldie Lay/Theological Training Institution, Arochukwu, Abia State, Nigeria, (affiliated to Abia State University, Uturu) and Essien Ukpabio Presbyterian Theological College, Itu, Akwa Ibom State (An Affiliate of the University of Calabar. These theological Colleges are used to train ministers for the Presbyterian Church of Nigeria. The current rector of Hugh Goldie is Rt. Rev. Theophilus Chukwu Ngele, PhD. Whereas the current Rector of Essien Ukpabio Presbyterian Theological College, Itu is Rt. Rev. Dr. Ivan Ekong.

== Interchurch organisations ==
It is a member of the World Council of Churches, the All Africa Conference of Churches, the Christian Council of Nigeria, the World Communion of Reformed Churches, the ARCA and the Reformed Ecumenical Council and the Reformed Ecumenial Council of Nigeria as of 2006. It was founded in the 19th century. It has had female ministers for decades. The secretariat is in Aba, Nigeria, while the office of the prelate and moderator of the General Assembly is in Calabar. The current prelate and moderator of the General Assembly of the Presbyterian Church of Nigeria is Ekpenyong Nyong Akpanika.

== DIPA New Officers ==
The General Assembly of the Presbyterian Church of Nigeria appointed two desk officers to oversee the activities of the Department of Information and Public Affairs. This appointment took effect from September 1, 2025. The two desk officers are:

- Rev. Godfrey Okon (Calabar Office) https://www.linkedin.com/in/godfreymokon
- Rev. Albert Ikechukwu Chima (Aba Office)

== DIPA Old Officers ==
These are the Department of Information and Public Affairs Officers of the Presbyterian Church of Nigeria

- Rt. Rev. Nnoke Ibe, PhD (Director of Information and Public Affairs of the Presbyterian Church of Nigeria)
- Rev. Chijioke Elekwa Agbaeze (Secretary)
- Rev. Daniel Ikenga Eke (ICT)
- Mr. Mandor Benbella Peter (Media)
