= Daniel Okoh =

Nigerian pastor and administrator

7th President of CAN
- Incumbent
- Assumed office 2022
- Preceded by: Supo Ayokunle

Personal details
- Born: Daniel Okoh

Most Rev. Daniel C. Okoh is General Overseer of the Christ Holy Church International, a.k.a. Nation Builders, a former vice President of the Christian Association of Nigeria, and President of the Organisation of African Instituted Churches. Daniel Okoh was elected President of the Christian Association of Nigeria (CAN) in July 2022. CAN is the apex body of all Christians in the country, comprising five blocs. He became the first from the OAIC bloc of Christian Association of Nigeria to hold the position.
