= Royal House of Grace International Church =

Nigerian church

- Classification: Evangelicalism
- Theology: Neo-charismatic movement
- Headquarters: 13 Grace land Avenue, Port Harcourt, Rivers State, Nigeria
- Founder: Apostle Zilly Aggrey
- Origin: 1992 (33 years ago) Port Harcourt, Nigeria
- Official website: None in 2023

The Royal House of Grace International Church is a church in Nigeria that was founded in 1992 by Apostle Zilly Aggrey. The church has its headquarters at New GRA, Port Harcourt, Rivers State.

== History ==
The Royal House of Grace International Church started in 30 October 1992 with 15 persons in attendance. Over the years the church grew and there was a need for a bigger auditorium because of the growth. The church moved to their current headquarters in 1997.

In 2021, Aggrey was the General Overseer of the church, and was also the National Vice President (South-South) of Pentecostal Fellowship of Nigeria (PFN).

In 2022, the planned 30th anniversary celebrations were postponed due to flooding.
