= The African Church =

Christian denomination established in Nigeria in 1901

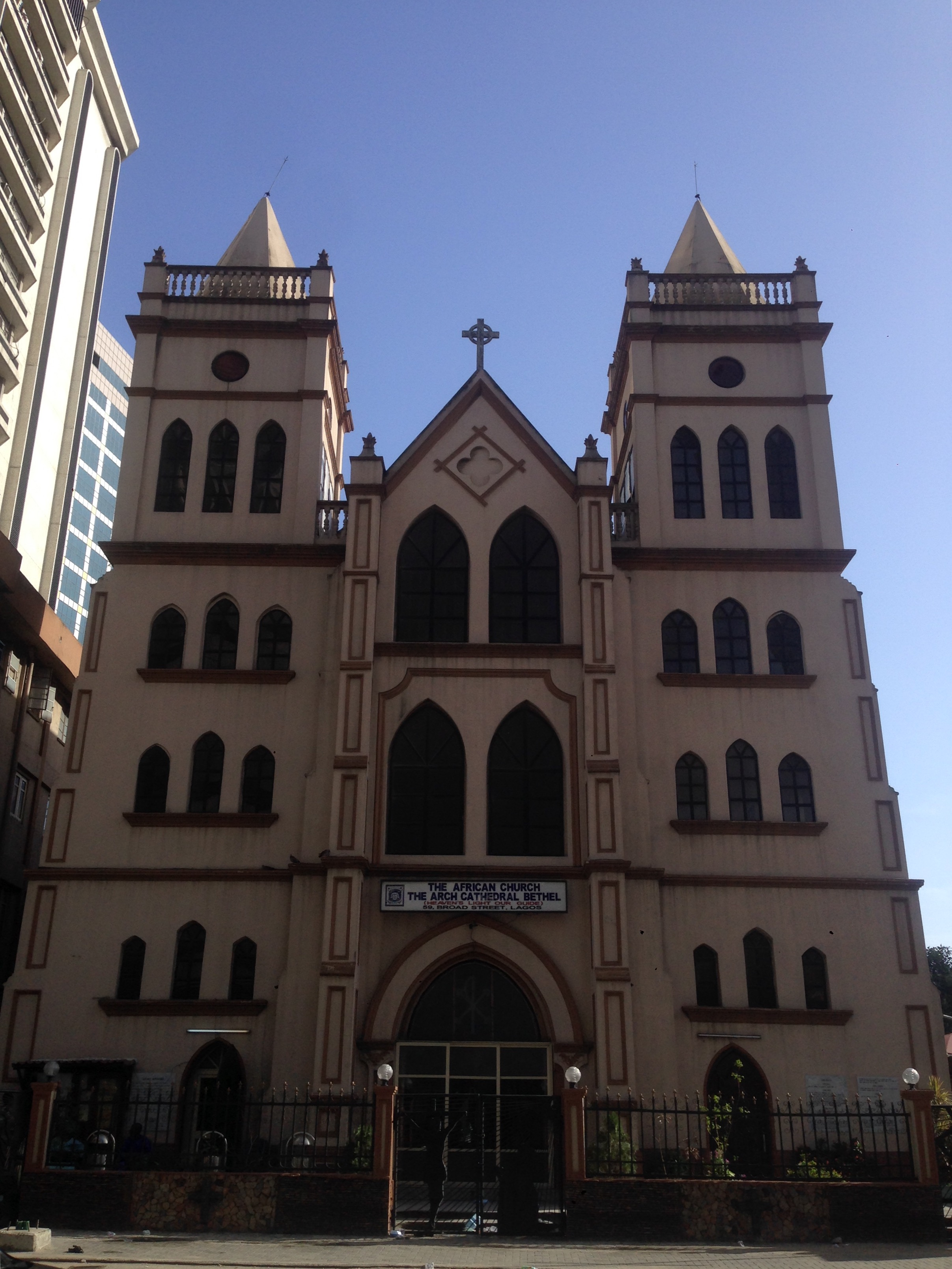
The Arch Cathedral Bethel, Lagos

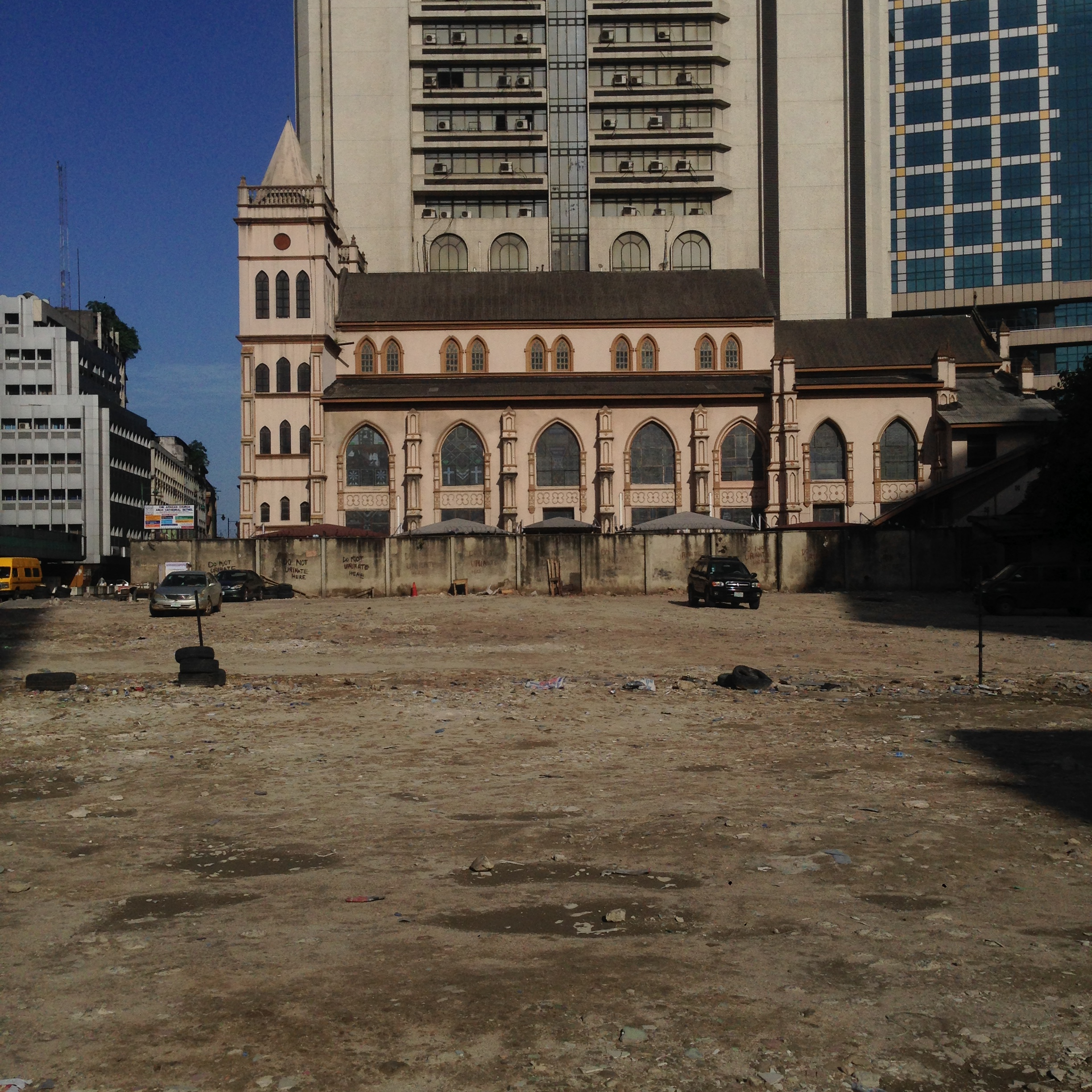
The Arch Cathedral Bethel, Lagos

The African Church is a Christian denomination that was established in the British colonial areas that later became Nigeria in 1901. It was established after strong disagreements arose between the European leadership of the Anglican Church and the native African leadership. Following the installation of Bishop Samuel Ajayi Crowther, a black African leader of the Anglican Church and translator of the Bible into the Yoruba language, as the head of Church of Nigeria, a number of African clerics obtained progressive education but did not advance in the leadership of the Church. This led to schisms that finally led to the formation of the indigenous African Church. Since 1983 clergy are trained at the African Church College of Theology which since 1992 has been affiliated with the University of Ibadan. The church runs three schools, two hospitals and some social centres and development projects.

== Early history ==
The African Church is always remembered for leading a revolution. In 1901, one elder, Jacob Kehinde Coker, who was then called the People's Warden, led some people out of the Anglican church in protest over the ill-treatment of Africans in the white-dominated church. These revolutionaries protested the mode of worship, which had no regard for African musical instruments, and the fact that people had to wear European clothes and sing only Western hymns.

The Church held its first service on 17 October 1901, led by J.K Coker and a group of ministers who disagreed with the Anglican Church European leadership led by Bishop Turgwell of St. Paul's Church. The church met at the Rose Cottage, Marina (a site later occupied by Leventis Stores) for its first service.

Relating the first worship experience at this young church in 1901, the Pa Coker in his unpublished biography wrote:

On Sunday, the 20th of October, 1901 the first divine services was held in Rose Cottage under a canopy. It was estimated that between 600 and 800 worshippers gathered at Rose Cottage for this memorable service. Some of those who had formed the church acted as the choir and Lay Preacher D. A. J. Oguntolu preached his first powerful sermon taking his text from Song of Solomon chapter 1 verse 6: "Don't look down upon me because I am black because the sun has tanned me,--my brothers were angry with me and made me work in the vineyard. I had no time to care for myself." (R.S.V) Mr. Oguntolu emphasized that Africans have been worshipping Christ as Europeans who were watching, guarding and guiding their customs, beliefs and mode of worship while they had neglected their own. He emphasized that Christ to Europeans was a European and to Africans he should be an African. He stressed that they had been sufficiently taught to know that Christianity should now become an African religion.

The Church in its early history faced persecution in the hands of the colonial government in Lagos - under the influence of the CMS Church (Anglican) from which it had broken away. Due to its inability to obtain land, it resorted to leasing land from influential members for five years, and built its first church in Lagos, the Bethel Church leased by B. A. Roberts, A. E. Coates and D. A. J. Oguntolu on Balogun street. The church was initially built in twenty-eight days at a cost of £350 to accommodate 600 members. It was dedicated on 22 December 1901 by Rev. J. S. Williams, vicar of St. Jude's Church, Ebute-Metta (who later became Primate). A second church known as African Church, Salem was later separately incorporated and led expansion efforts separately. The Salem and Bethel parts of the Church later merged under the name African Church Incorporated. Moves to incorporate similar African Churches (specifically, United Native African Church, U.N.A., and the United African Methodist Church, U.A.M.) nearly engulfed the African Churches in an internal crisis between 1927 and 1937. This effort was led by J.K Coker, a wealthy layman often regarded as the father of African Independent Churches. The major source of disagreement was polygamy, which was forbidden by the African Church for clergy but was allowed by the other churches. The merger was scuttled and the other churches remained distinct from the African Church. The African Church however, unlike the Anglican Church of the time, did baptize polygamists' children, and allowed its members to take traditional titles.

== Establishment and structure ==
The African Church is led by His Eminence, Augustine Afolabi Odufuwa, the 13th Primate of the Church.

The African Church structure has a Primate who serves as the spiritual head and the overall head of the church, and a Lay President who is the head of the laity and who assist The Primate in temporal matters. Major decisions affecting the Church are taken by both the clergy and the laity. The highest governing body is the Conference. Since 1983 clergy are trained at the African Church College of Theology, which was affiliated for many years with the University of Ibadan. The Church has had several Primates in the past. It is spread all over, with seven Provinces comprising forty-seven Dioceses in every geopolitical zone of the country.

As of 2006 the church membership was about 2,080,000, with 580 priests in 47 dioceses, primarily in Nigeria. It had 720 individual parishes. Church membership dropped as the rise of new day Pentecostal churches challenged older-established orders in Nigeria.

The Church runs several schools, two hospitals and some social centers and development projects. It publishes a guide for daily Bible reading (in English and Yoruba). The Church is widely popular in major cities outside Lagos, especially in Oyo, Ijebu, Ekiti, Ondo, Osun, Kwara, Kogi, Akwa Ibom, Cross River, Rivers, Benue and other areas. The Church is headquartered in Lagos, Lagos State; participates in the activities of the Christian Association of Nigeria and World Council of Churches.

== Doctrine ==
The World Council of Churches (WCC) describes the doctrine of the church as follows on its website.

In its doctrine and liturgy The African Church has remained close to the Anglican tradition. Its mission statement reads:

The African Church receives and accepts the Bible as the standard of its faith. She also accepts the Old Testament and the New Testament as being canonical, and sufficient for salvation. She accepts and believes in the Fatherhood of God and the Holy Trinity.

The church practices the sacraments of baptism and holy communion.

== Unification ==
Efforts of ecumenism by unification talks between the Anglican Communion in Nigeria (Church of Nigeria) led by its Primate Peter Akinola and the African Church due to their common historical/orthodox position on the prohibition of non-celibate gay men in the priesthood have taken place. However the two churches differ on doctrines of marriage, burial of the dead, ministerial hierarchy and the authority of the clergy. Eight delegates from each church—including bishops, clergy and laity—met formally on 29 August in Ibadan for dialogue on issues relating to the reunification have been reported on. The council considered a document entitled Anglican-African Conversations, which was jointly agreed to by leaders of both churches.

== See also ==
- African-initiated church
- New religious movement
