= Full Life Christian Centre =

Church in Uyo, Nigeria

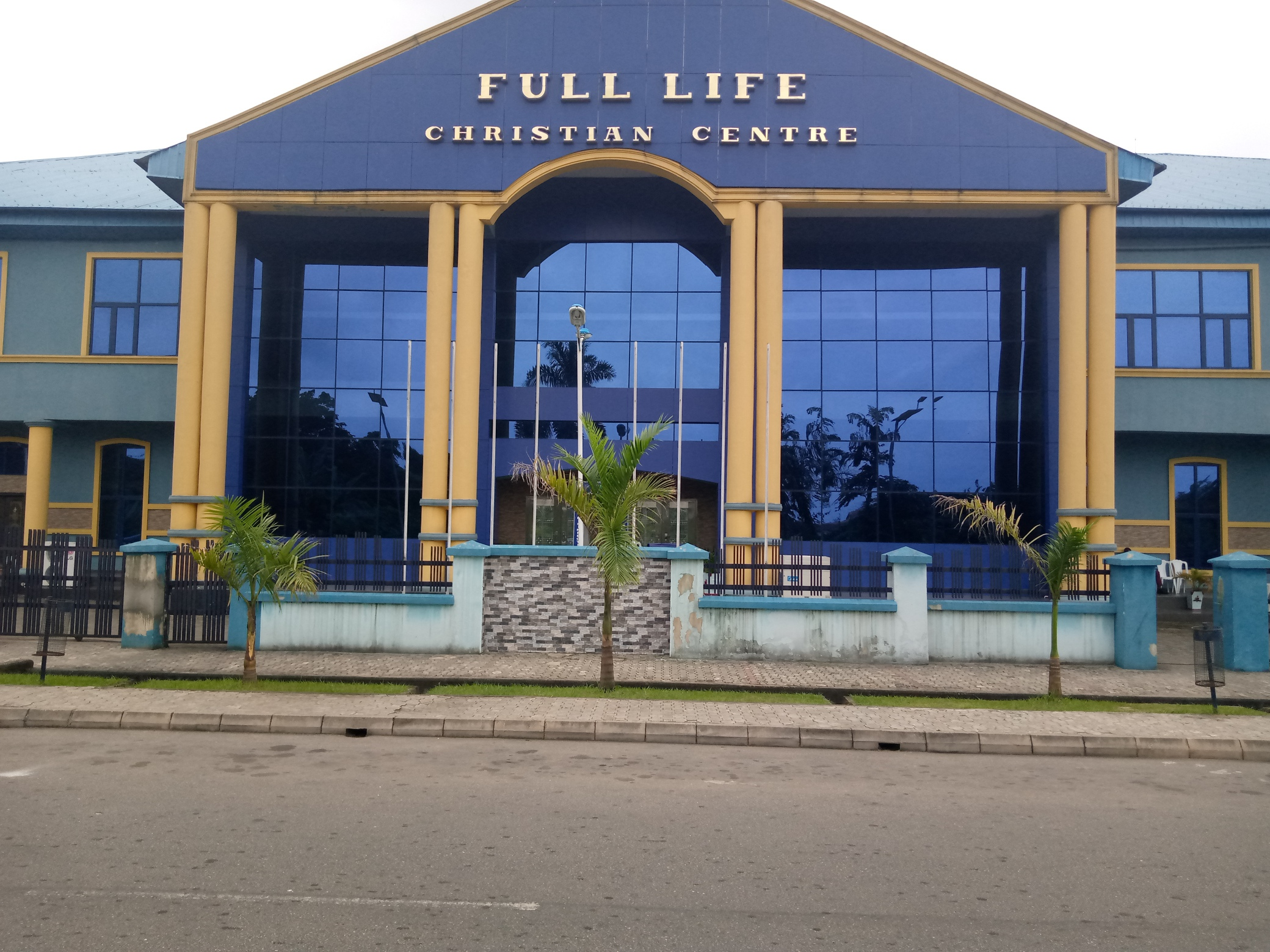
- Full Life Christian Centre Headquarters, Uyo
- Full Life Christian Centre
- Location: Full Life Avenue, Uyo, Akwa Ibom State, Nigeria
- Country: Nigeria
- Denomination: Pentecostal
- Website: www.fulllifefoundation.org

History
- Founded: June 2000
- Founder: Ntia Ime Ntia

Clergy
- Pastor: Ukamaka Ntia

Full Life Christian Centre, also known as Full Life Church, is a Pentecostal Christian denomination and megachurch with headquarters in Uyo, the capital city of Akwa Ibom State, Nigeria. Founded by Reverend Ntia I. Ntia in June 2000, the church is adjudged one of the largest congregations in South-South Nigeria, with an average weekly attendance of 10,000 meeting in the Church’s largest worship facility Noah’s Ark Auditorium. Ntia I. Ntia is the senior pastor. He pastors the church alongside his wife, Pastor Ukamaka Ntia and many other pastors.

== History ==
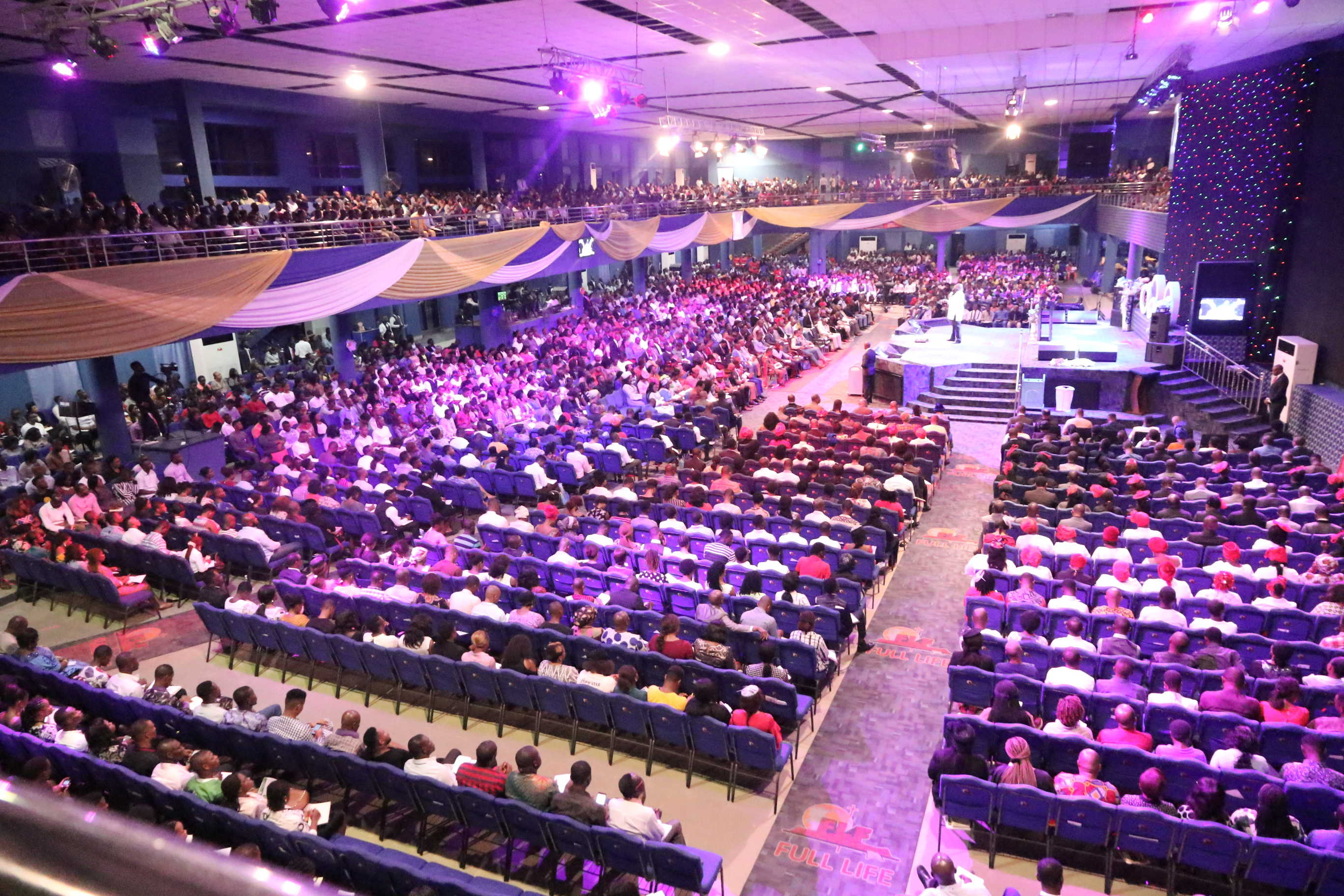
Worship service at Noah's Ark Auditorium, affiliated to the Full Life Christian Centre, in 2019, in Uyo, Nigeria

Full Life Christian Centre, also known as Full Life Foundation, was founded by Rev. Ntia I Ntia, in June 2000 when he moved to Uyo from Enugu.

In 2008, Reverend Ntia announced that the church had acquired yet another property on Nsikak Eduok Avenue. This is where a 4000-seater auditorium -- named 'Noah's Ark Auditorium' -- was built.

The church started two services in Noah's Ark Auditorium on Sundays in order to accommodate the teeming number of worshippers. Within a year, the number of services increased to three.

Today, the Noah's Ark Auditorium is the biggest church auditorium in Akwa Ibom and currently has a seating capacity of 10,000.

== Major events ==
=== Gathering of Warriors Convention ===
This is the church's annual international convention. The event, which usually lasts for a week, is held at the Noah's Ark Auditorium. The 2018 edition - with the theme "All Good Things" - was held from July 1 to July 8, 2018. It was attended by several prominent preachers, including Uma Ukpai.
