= Fellowship of Churches of Christ in Nigeria =

Federation of Christian denominations in Nigeria

The Fellowship of Churches of Christ in Nigeria (TEKAN) is a federation of Christian denominations in Northern Nigeria. It was founded in 1955. Its president is Archbishop Nemuel Abubakar Babba.

== Members ==
(Source)

- Church of Christ in Nigeria (COCIN)
- The Lutheran Church of Christ in Nigeria (LCCN)
- Christian Reformed Church of Nigeria (CRCN)
- United Methodist Church of Nigeria (UMCN)
- Evangelical Reformed Church of Christ (ERCC)
- Ekklesiyar Yan'uwa a Nigeria (EYN)
- Nongo Krist Ken Sudan hen Tiv (NKST)
- United Church of Christ in Nigeria (HEKAN)
- Mambila Baptist Convention of Nigeria (MBCN)
- Nigerian Reformed Church (NRC)
- Evangelical Church of Christ in Nigeria (ECCN)
- Reformed Church of Christ in Nigeria (RCCN)
- All Nations Christian Assembly (ANCA)

== See also ==
- Christianity in Nigeria
- Theological College of Northern Nigeria
