= Word of Life Bible Church =

Coordinates: 5°31′42.6″N 5°44′03.0″E

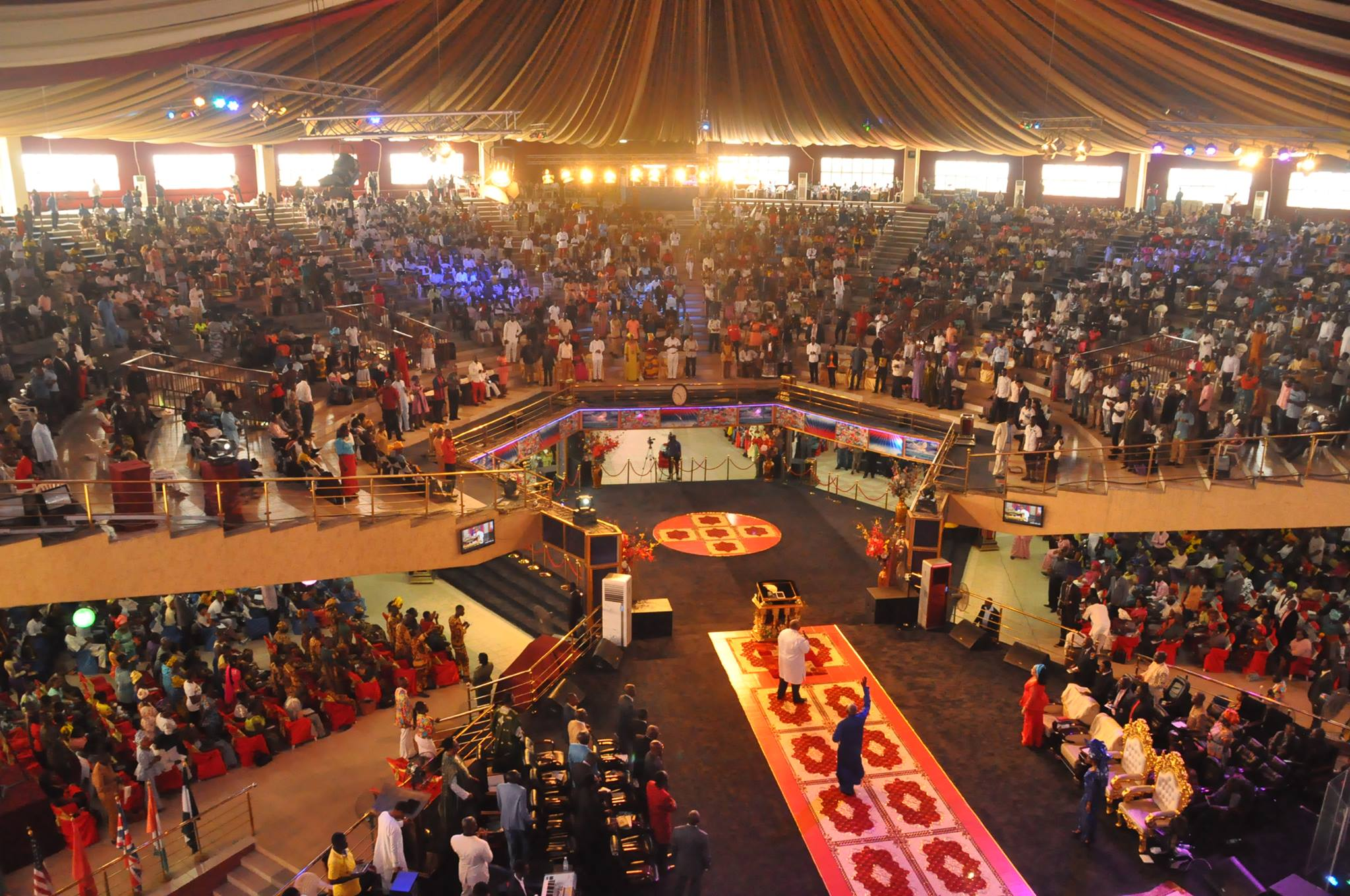
- Worship service in 2015
- Word of Life Bible Church
- Location: Warri, Delta
- Country: Nigeria
- Denomination: Non-denominational, Pentecostal
- Website: ayo-oritsejafor.org

History
- Founded: November 15, 1987
- Founder: Ayo Oritsejafor

Specifications
- Capacity: 35,000
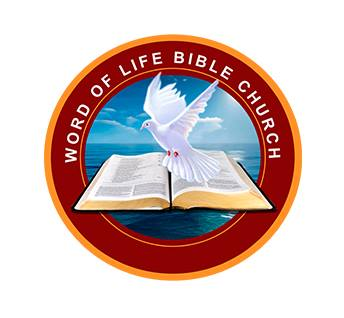

Word of Life Bible Church (WLBC) is a Pentecostal Christian megachurch located in Warri, Delta, Nigeria. It is one of the largest congregations in Nigeria, averaging about 30,000 attendees per week. The church now has congregations in over 70 locations worldwide. The senior pastor is Ayo Oritsejafor.

== History ==
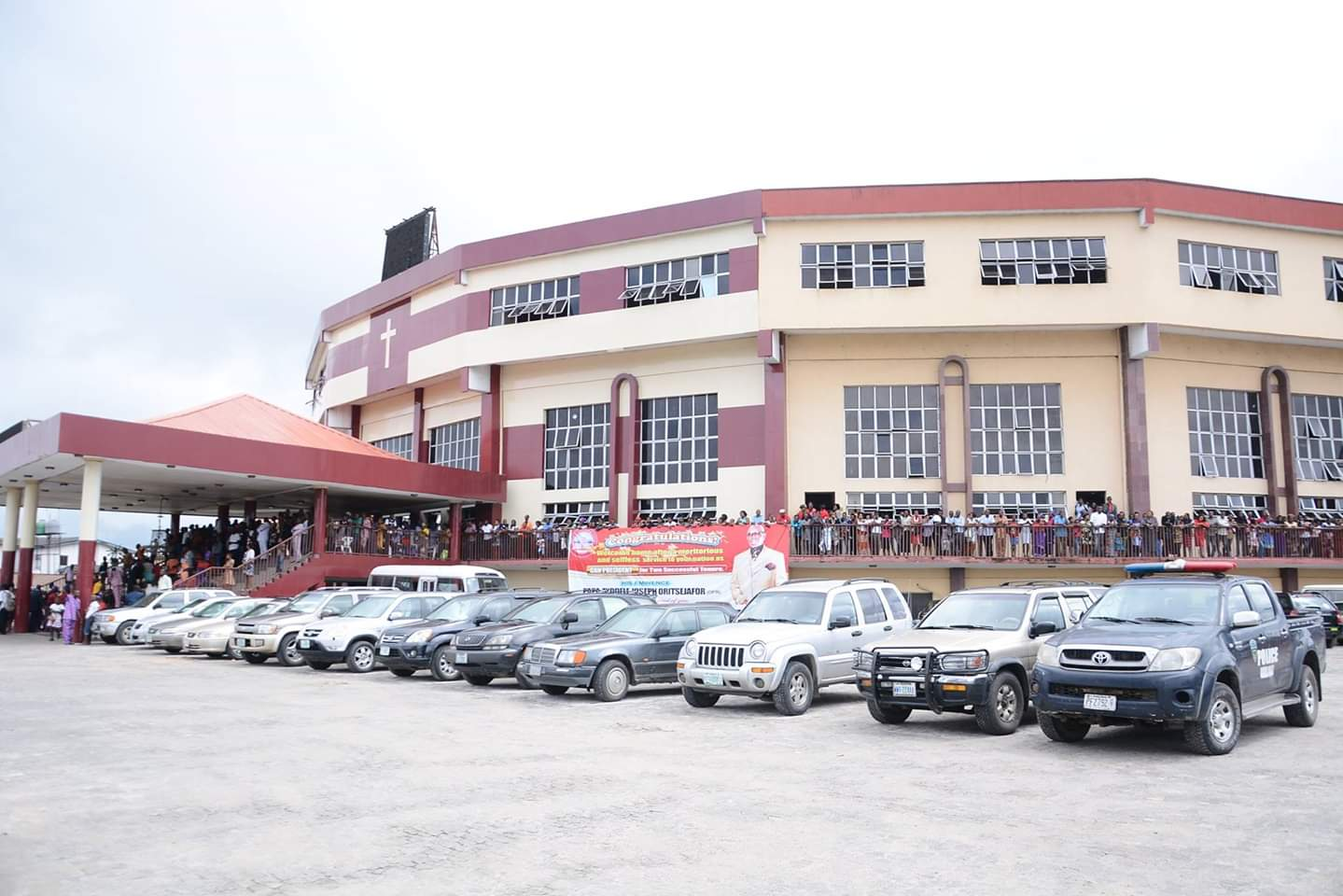
International Gospel Centre (IGC) Building in Warri, Nigeria

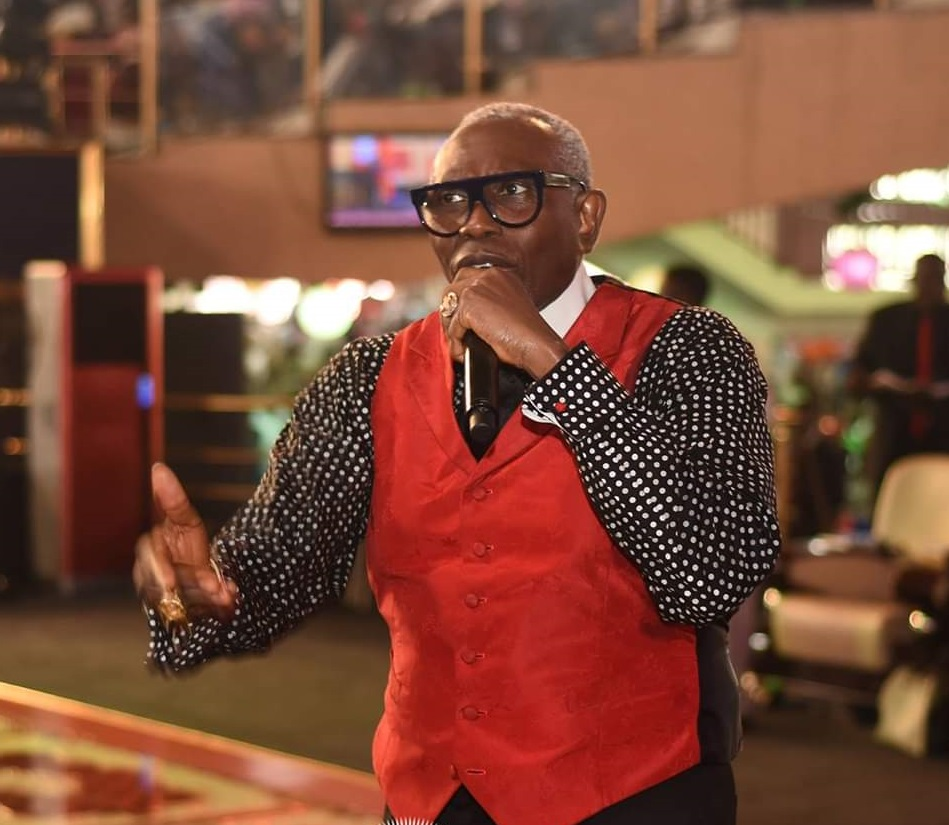
Ayo Oritsejafor at Word of Life Bible Church, February 14, 2016

Word of Life Bible Church started on November 15, 1987, by Ayo Oritsejafor and his first wife, Stella, inside a warehouse in Plot 12, Enerhen, Uvwie, central district of Delta. Ayo was a Church of God Mission International pastor, under the leadership of Archbishop B.A. Idahosa, but after receiving a mandate from God, he founded Word of Life Bible Church as a Bible believing church for all who seek God. In 1982, Ayo and Stella created and hosted a television program, called the Hour of Deliverance, which later became the church's television broadcast which could be seen in many parts of the world.

By 1994, the church attendance was estimated over three thousand, prompting the acquisition of a large piece of property in Ajamimogha, Warri. Thereafter, construction of its new auditorium called the International Gospel Centre commenced at the church permanent headquarters. Upon Stella Oritsejafor's death in March 1996, Ayo remarried in April 1997 to Helen, who became the co-pastor.

Under Ayo and Helen Oritsejafor, Word of Life Bible Church's congregation increased almost fivefold. Attendance increased to 8,000 weekly, prompting the completion of its new auditorium. In 2000, the church relocated to the International Gospel Center, which was officially opened on November 19, 2000, by Dr. Morris Cerullo. It is a 35,000-seat facility in southwest Delta State along 118/120 Ajamimogha, that has over five times the capacity of its former tabernacle.

In 2025, the weekly worship attendance of the church in Warri averaged 30,000.

== Beliefs ==
Word of Life Bible Church believes that the Holy Bible consisting of 66 books is the inspired, authoritative and infallible word of God and center its teachings on this belief. The church also holds in account the belief in the Trinity. From the commands found in the Bible, the church believe:

- In Repentance towards God. Acts 3:19.
- In Justification and Regeneration. John 3:3.
- In Restitution where possible. Luke 19:8-9.
- In Sanctification (Holiness). I Thess. 4:3.
- In Baptism of the Holy Spirit with the evidence of speaking in tongues and in the gift of the Holy Spirit. Mk. 16:17-18.
- In Water Baptism by Immersion. Acts 8:38, 39.
- In Divine Healing. Isaiah. 53:5.
- In the second coming of Jesus Christ as literal and visible as His First ascension to Heaven. Acts 1:9-11.
- In Eternal Heaven and Eternal Hell. Rev. 14:1-11.
- That the Lord's Supper should be observed by all believers in accordance with I Cor. 11:23-28.
- That excerpts where otherwise provided for in Scriptural marriage is binding for life. Matt. 11:9, I Cor.7:15.
- That Tithing is a command to all believers. Mal. 3:7-10.

The church is known for its Word of Life, Faith and Deliverance based teaching. It is also known, before every sermon is given by the senior pastor, for a confession that the congregation repeats in unison;

This is my Bible, it is the word of God, I believe I am what it says I am, I believe I have what it says I have, and I believe I can do what it says I can do, because it is the word of God, neighbor do you believe it? Because I do. Amen.

== Church organization ==
Word of Life Bible Church offers several types of services, ministries, fellowships and outreaches depending on its parishioners’ age, marital status and peculiar needs. In order to reach its members with the message of Jesus, the church operates five core fellowships; Children Evangelical Ministry (CEM), Teen's Fellowship known as “Action Teens for Christ Fellowship” (ATCF), for teenagers, WLBC Youths for singles within the age bracket of twenty to thirty five, Women and Men's Fellowship for couples and adults from age thirty six and above.

=== Services ===
- Children Evangelical Ministry: Children
- Main Service: All Youths and Adults
- WLBC Campus: The Church operates campus services for in-university, colleges, and polytechnic young adults across Nigeria.

=== Television ===
The church's weekly services are broadcast on African Broadcasting Network, as well as local channels in Nigeria and through a live internet feed. Hour of Deliverance is the television ministry of Word of Life Bible Church. It airs thrice a day, seven days a week, and is available in over 95 percent of Nigeria and in most other nations across Africa, Asia and Europe. The broadcast features Ayo and Helen's sermons.

=== Education ===
Several educational institutions are associated with the church, including Eagle Heights International Schools, a Bible school called International School of Ministry - a private Christian college located in Warri, Nigeria. This college offer diplomas in Bible and ministry-related studies. In addition, the church in May 2014, started construction of its university called Eagle Heights University located in Omadino, Delta.

== Major events ==
=== Jubilee Word Festival ===
This is the major conference hosted by Word of Life Bible Church every year in November. The conference is uniquely tag with a theme with which the church runs with throughout the following year. Jubilee Word Festival marks the end of the church year.

=== Let God Arise ===
Let God Arise is a conference that runs throughout the month of August, with different guest speakers. It has been going on every year since it began.

=== Yadah ===
Yadah is a musical concert held in Delta with gospel artiste from Nigeria and around the world attending. It is a free event hosted by Word of Life Bible Church every year since its inception on December 23, 2018, at the International Gospel Centre.

== See also ==
- Christianity in Nigeria
- List of the largest evangelical church auditoriums
- Evangelical Churches
- List of churches in Nigeria
- List of the largest churches in Nigeria
