= Christian Reformed Church of Nigeria =

The Christian Reformed Church of Nigeria (CRC-N) is a Christian church that was established in 1951 under the name "Ekklisiyar Kristi a Sudan (EKAS) Lardin "Benue" meaning, "The church of Christ in Sudan, Benue region", and known under its current name since 1976. It belongs to the Fellowship of Churches of Christ in Nigeria (Tarayyar Ekklisiyar Kristi a Nigeria, TEKAN) and the World Communion of Reformed Churches.

== History ==
The Christian Reformed Church, Nigeria (CRC-N) came into being after many years of effort on the part of Sudan United Mission (SUM). In 1904 the SUM under the leadership of Dr. Herman Karl kum sailed to Nigeria together with others as Ambrose H Bateman, John Gunter and J Lowry Maxwell. After, receiving permission by the then British High Commissioner in Northern Nigeria to establish at Wase, the party travelled from Lokoja and arrived at Ibi. From there they moved to Wase. Because of Islamic influence at Wase, the work did not go well. Mr. John Burt traveled to Wukari and there they made the first attempt to establish the mission centre. Dr. Lowry Maxwell went to Wukari from Ibi and preached the gospel there for the first time in 1905. Subsequently, he went to Donga with same message that same year. Consequently, Wukari became a new Mission station. However, the work in Wukari met with poor response and the missionaries moved inland and establish at Donga a new station in 1907. The Church in Donga was constituted as a Church on 17 June 1917. Between 1910 and 1920, several visits were made to Lupwe-Takum area for possible expansion of the gospel. In 1916, Mr. Filibus Ashu Angyu was sent to Takum to become an evangelist there. Thus, indigenous missionaries started work in Takum before white missionaries went there. Rev. Whitman investigated Takum area and recommended that a station be opened at Lupwe. By 1919, Mr. William Nuckle Bristow built a station at Lupwe. In February, 1921, Mr. Whitman and Miss Johanna Veenstra arrived Lupwe from Donga. About this time, there was revival at Wukari and Ibi. A congregation started at Ibi in 1922. The gospel continued to grow due to the indigenous converts, who themselves became evangelists to their people. By 1936 Mr Edgar Smith and Siman Atajiri took the gospel to Nyita. There were converts there and the Chief of Nyita encouraged the people to embrace Christianity. By 1937, Mr Istifanus Audu, Edgar Smith, Musa Chiroma and Habila Adda took the gospel to the Kurmi area. The Ndola, Tigon and Ichen people there embraced the gospel. A station was built in Baissa. The Takum Church sent people like Bulus Kweshi to become an evangelist in Ndoro area in 1942. Also, by 1943, the Takum church sent Mr Daniel Andeyantso to be an evangelist at Ashuku, a Tigon town. Again the Takum church sent Mr Dauda Mbo to Ndaforo. Thus, the gospel took root and grew in Kurmi among the Ndoro, Tiggon and Ichen people. It is worthy to note that all these indigenous workers were not ordained nor were they paid, but of voluntary service.

=== CRCNA Take Over ===
At the beginning in 1904, the Mission field under consideration was under the SUM British Branch. It was Johanna Veenstra that first came as a Christian Reformed member of the SUM branch from America. Johanna Veenstra linked the Mission field to the Reformed branch during her thirteen years of service. Before her death, she had prepared ground for Christian Reformed Church, North America (CRCNA) takeover of the mission field. The process of taking over began in 1937. By 1939, the SUM. American Committee agreed to recommend the British branch of SUM that the Lupwe field should be given to the CRC. During the Synod of 7 July 1939, it was decided that Lupwe Takum Station should be taken over to become a CRC Mission project. This take-over also included Ibi, Wukari and Donga Stations. Therefore, in 1940 the Christian Reformed Church of America officially took over the Mission Field of the present CRCN.

=== Birth of an Indigenous Church ===
The indigenous church was formed during its first meeting at IBI on 25 July 1951 under the name "Ekklisiyar Kristi a Sudan (EKAS) Lardin "Benue" meaning, "The church of Christ in Sudan, Benue region" The name of the new church was publicised through conference. The leaders explained the new name to the people and unity was emphasized. The Trustee of the Church was registered by the government of Nigeria, in August 1960. The church therefore became legally constituted autonomous body incorporated under the LAND (PERPETUAL) ACT CAP. 98 in Lagos under the name Ekklisiyar Kristi a Sudan (EKAS) Lardin Benue.

=== Change of Name ===
Later the name EKAS was changed to "Ekklisiyar Kristi A Nigeria (EKAN). Political changes took place and Benue found herself in both Benue and Sardauna provinces since Baissa and Serti was located in Sandauna province. The name therefore changed to EKAN Benue and Sardauna (EKAN 4BS.) In 1967, twelve states were created, Takum-Wukari and Donga stations were found in the then Benue Plateau State. Further than in 1976, when additional states were created, the old problem resurfaced as the church found herself to be in the (then) Gongola State and part of Benue State. At this point, the church decided to change her name to reflect that of the Mission which had originally established her, so as to avoid further complication by political changes, the church became known as the "Christian Reformed Church of Nigeria." (CRCN) The leaders of the church used to be called "Chairmen" but now the heads of the denomination are called "Presidents".

== Statistics ==
CRC-N has over 284 ordained ministers in active service. She has 154 consistories and 19 Regional Church Councils. She has a total of at least 200,000 members across the country. The Church is rooted in Taraba and her neighboring states. There are some consistories and worship centres in urban cities such as Abuja, Lagos, Maiduguri, Zaria, Jos etc. Abuja became in Regional Church Council on 31 October 2009 with eight (8) Local Church Councils- LCC Jos, 17 Oct. 2009; LCC Lagos- 25 Oct. 2009; LCC Abuja at Wumba District- 31ST Oct. 2009; LCC Nyanya- 31 Oct. 2009; LCC Kubwa- 31 Oct 2009; LCC Gwagwalada- 31 Oct. 2009; LCC Kabusa- 31 Oct. 2009;LCC Zaria, 11 July 2014.

== Educational institutions ==
The church owns the Veenstra Theological Seminary (VTS) Donga, where most of the pastors are being trained. VTS Donga formed an affiliation with the Taraba State University located in Jalingo on 17 June 2022. Other pastors are trained at the Theological College of Northern Nigeria (TCNN) Bukuru where CRCN is also a co-proprietor alongside other TEKAN churches. Besides VTS, CRCN has 3 Christian Training College (CTC), 8 Secondary Schools, 28 Nursery and Primary Schools.

== Boards/Ministries ==
The church has 5 Boards as Departments for proper control and management. These boards include the following:

1. The CRCN Mission Board/Department. She is endowed with the responsibility of evangelism and discipleship
2. Theological Education Board – To oversee as Board of Governors to VTS and handle any theological issue facing the Church.
3. Christian Education Board – The Education Department of the church takes care of the CTCs, the Nursery primary and Secondary Schools and all education programs of the church such as Bible studies and Sunday School materials.
4. CRCN Youth Board – The Youth Ministry oversees all youth discipleship, revivals and leadership development programs
5. The CRCN Integrated Development Program (IDP) This Department takes care of social services in the church. There are some other units such as the Community Development, Agricultural extension program, Rural Health Service, CRCN Peace Desk in charge of relief material and rehabilitation through trauma healing workshops, CRCN Life Anchor (LA) – This unit is sensitizing church members on the menace and control of HIV/AIDS and related diseases. The CRCN IDP works in conjunction with some international donor agencies to promote the work.

It has more than 210,000 members.

== Associations ==
The Bible is the infallible Word of God and the Church sees it as its anchor in all its teachings. the Church also take seriously apostolic and the following Reformed Creeds: Apostles Creed, Athanasian Creed, Nicene Creed, Canons of Dort, Heidelberg Catechism and other Reformed Confessions. It has Presbyterian church government with Local Church Council (156 in number) LCCS; classes or Regional Church Council (RCC) (19 RCCs) and Synods or General Church Council (GCC). It belongs to the Fellowship of Churches of Christ in Nigeria (Tarayyar Ekklisiyar Kristi a Nigeria, TEKAN) and the World Communion of Reformed Churches.

== Leadership ==
The Current Leadership of the Church are : 1. Rev. (Dr) Isaiah Jirapye Magaji: President 2. Rev. Wisdom Emmanuel Surupe: Vice President 3. Rev. Joseph Ahmadu Agbu: General Secretary

== See also ==
- Christianity in Nigeria
- Christian Reformed Church in North America
- https://www.crcnigeria.org.ng/
