= Bowen University =

University in Nigeria

- Motto: Excellence and Godliness
- Type: Private
- Established: 17 July 2001
- Affiliations: Nigerian Baptist Convention
- Vice-Chancellor: Jonathan Oyebamiji Babalola
- Students: 5,000
- Location: Iwo, Osun State, Nigeria; 7°37′25″N 4°11′20″E
- Campus: Urban
- Website: bowen.edu.ng
- Location within Nigeria

Bowen University is a private Baptist Christian Nigerian university located at Iwo in Osun State, Nigeria. It is affiliated with the Nigerian Baptist Convention.

== History ==
The university was founded on 17 July 2001 by the Nigerian Baptist Convention in the old 1,300-acre (6 km^{2}) campus of the Baptist College.

The Federal Government of Nigeria approved the establishment of the university, and it was subsequently licensed to operate by the National Universities Commission (NUC).

A Provisional Governing Council was inaugurated on 22 August 2001, with Professor J.T. Okedara as Vice Chancellor and Mr E. A. Lawale as Registrar. Academic activity started on 4 November 2002, with 506 students admitted into the Faculties of Agriculture, Science, Science Education, and Social and Management Sciences.

In 2009, the NUC approved degree programmes in Medicine (MBBS), Anatomy (B.Sc) and Physiology (B.Sc) into the university and in 2011, Bowen University received approvals to begin the Faculty of Humanities and Faculty of Law. In 2017, the University had about 5,000 students.

== Notable people ==
Alumni of the college include:

- Bukky Abaniwonda, Canadian actress of Nigerian descent.
- Damilola Adegbite, Nigerian Actress.
- Eva Alordia, Nigerian Rapper.
- Joshua Mike-Bamiloye, Nigerian gospel singer.
- Layi Wasabi, Nigerian Skit Maker and Content Creator

== Gallery ==
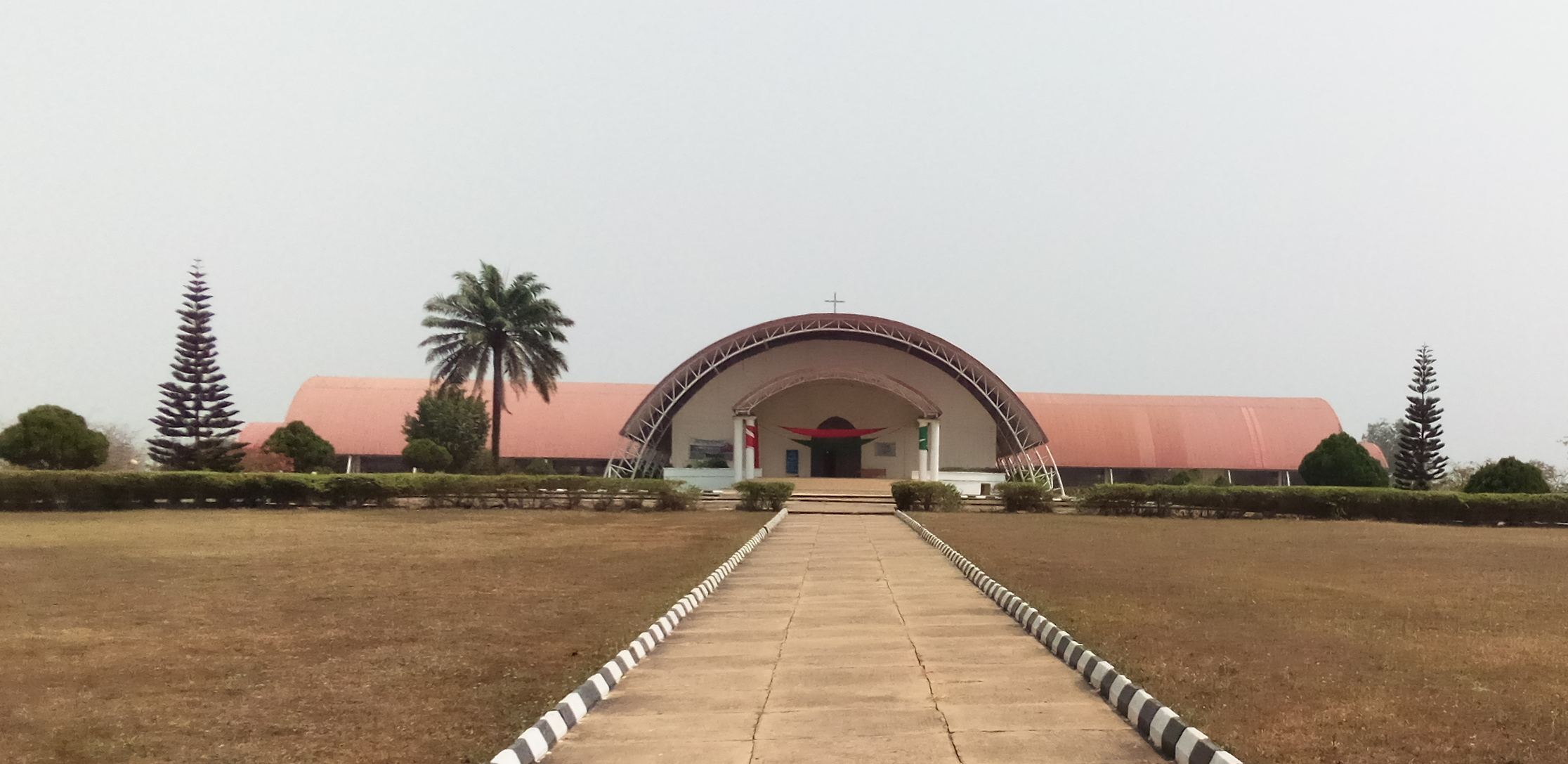
Bowen Worship Centre

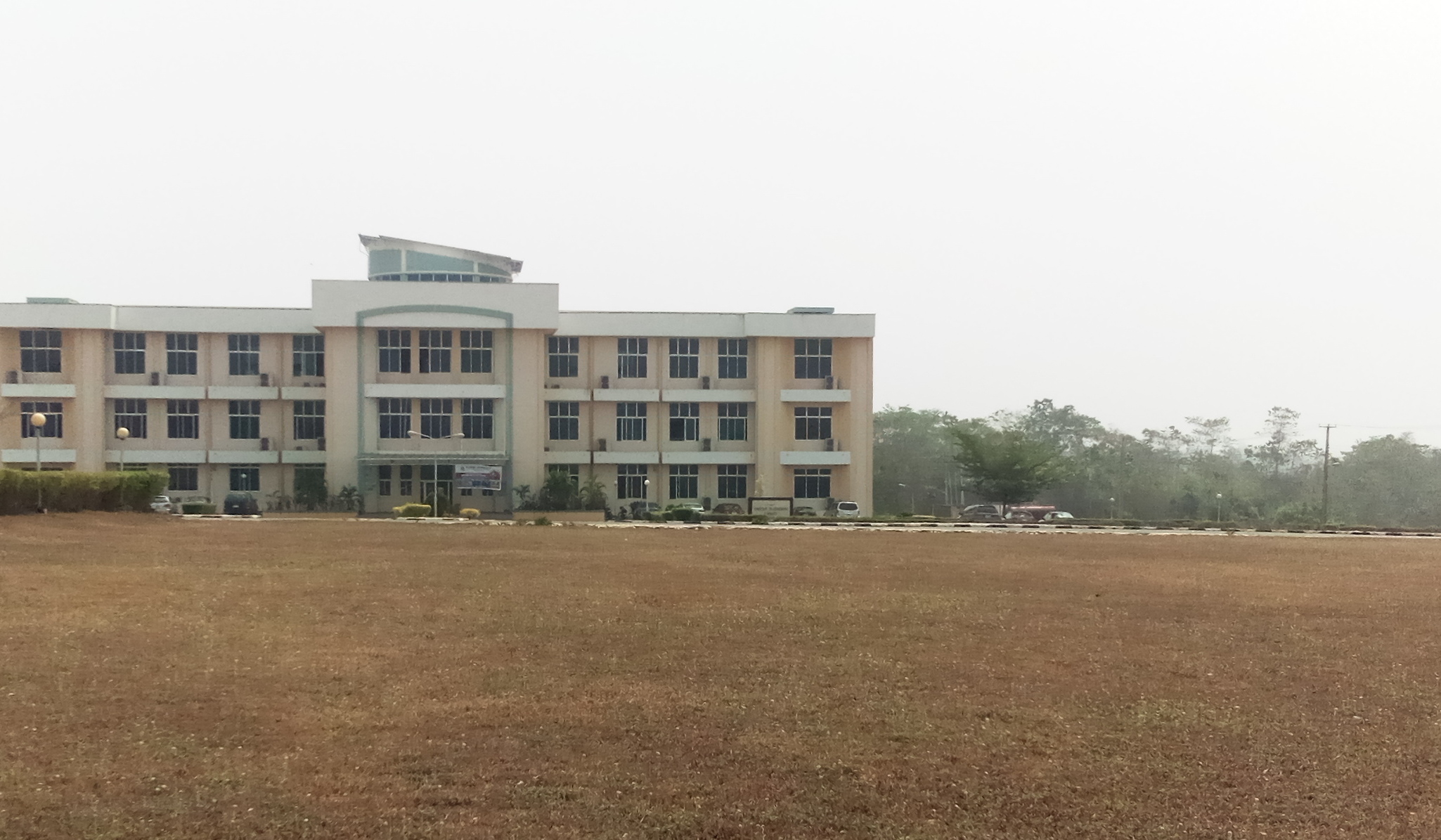
Timothy Olagbenro Library

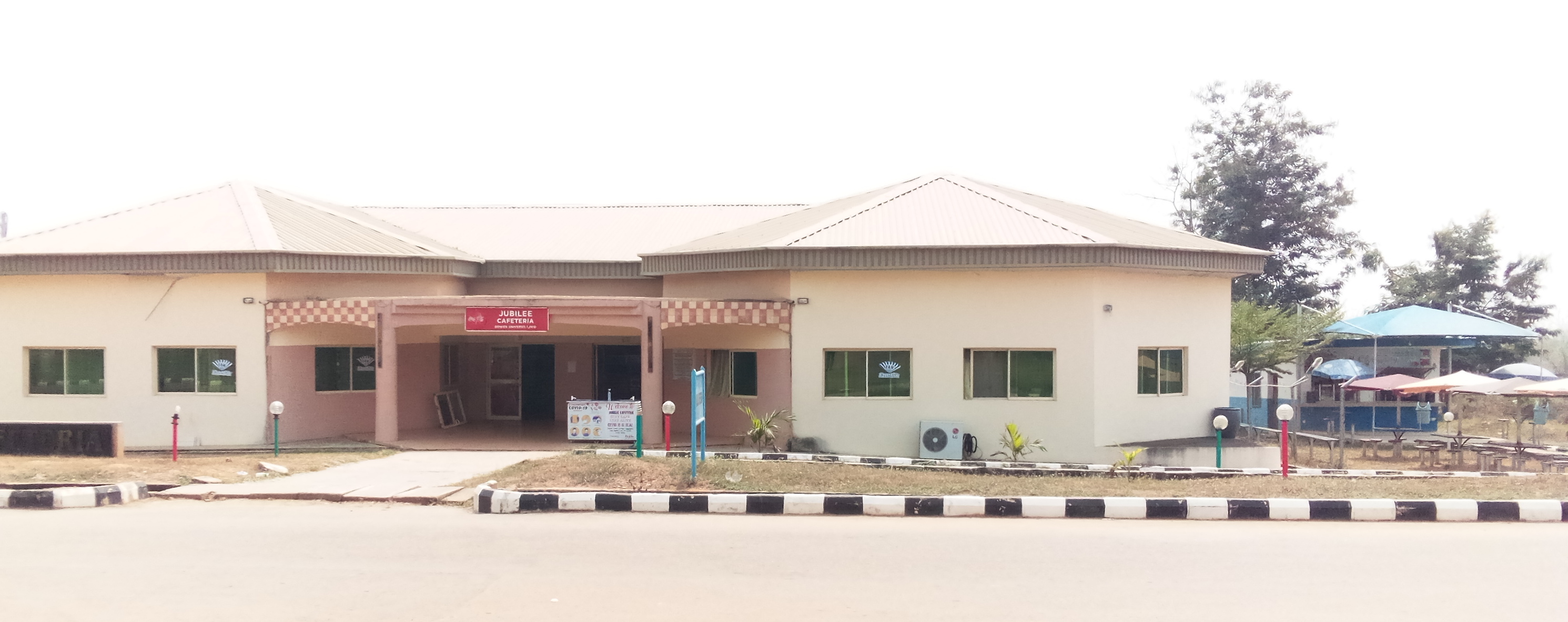
Jubilee Cafeteria
