= Solomon Odunaiya Odutola =

Anglican bishop in Nigeria

Reverend Solomon Odunaiya Odutola was an Anglican clergyman who was bishop of Benin-Ondo Diocese from 1952 to 1960 and Ibadan Diocese from 1960 to 1970. He was also an educationist who served as acting principal of C.M.S. Grammar School, Lagos.

== Life ==
Odutola was born in Ijebu-Ode c.1897 to the family of Deborah and A. Odutola. His father was known as 'agbaniselu' a community elder. He attended a local primary school, Christ Church School, Porogun, Ijebu-Ode at the expense of his maternal uncle and finished primary education at St John, Aroloya in Lagos. Little is known about his parents' religious background but it was while in primary school that he was baptised. Between 1912 and 1915, he completed secondary education at CMS Grammar School, Lagos when Rev Fanimokun was the principal. Odutola began his career as a pupil-teacher at this alma-mater, CMS Grammar School. He got rewarded for his fourteen-year service in teaching by being offered a scholarship to study at Fourah Bay College, it was around this time he stepped out of teaching to join the Anglican ministry. He was at the college from 1925 to 1929, thereafter, he returned to Nigeria and was posted to Kano as a Deacon of the Anglican church. Between 1930 and 1935, he spent most of his clergy duties in Northern Nigeria, he returned to Lagos to serve as acting principal of CMS in 1936. In 1939, he obtained a diploma in education from University of London and briefly returned to teaching for a year.

In 1942, Odutola was appointed Canon of the Cathedral Church of Christ, Lagos, he returned to the North three years later as Archdeacon of the Northern Province serving under Reverend Norman Sherwood Jones, Assistant Bishop of Lagos, in 1950, he was posted to Akure as Archdeacon, St David's Church, Akure. In 1952, he became Bishop of Ondo-Benin Diocese. Odutola grew up in an era where missionaries provided educational infrastructure, he believed that education cannot be divorced from religion and falling moral standards are results of a disregard for religion in education. Odutola was also involved in negotiations for a national church between Methodists, Anglicans and Presbyterians, but the movement never came to fruition.
