= Church of Christ in Nations =

Nigerian Christian denomination

- Abbreviation: COCIN
- Classification: Protestant
- Orientation: Continental Reformed
- Theology: Reformed
- Polity: Presbyterian
- President: Amos Mozoh
- Associations: Fellowship of Churches of Christ in Nigeria
- Region: Nigeria
- Headquarters: Jos, Plateau, Nigeria
- Founder: Karl Kumm
- Origin: 1904
- Branched from: Sudan United Mission
- Congregations: 2,000 (2022)
- Members: 8,000,000 (2022)
- Tertiary institutions: Karl kumm University Vom
- Seminaries: Gindiri Theological seminary, Cocin pastors college kabwir, and TCNN.
- Official website: cocinonline.org

The Church of Christ in Nations (COCIN) is a Christian denomination reformed headquartered in Jos, Plateau, Nigeria. Founded in 1904 as part of the Sudan United Mission, the church, in 2022, had over 8 million members in approximately and 2,000 congregations across the country.

== History ==
COCIN was established in 1904 by missionaries from the Sudan United Mission, an interdenominational mission founded by German-American missionaries.

Missionary work was initiated by the British branch of MUS in Borno province among the Kanuri, a majority Muslim tribe. In 1936, a leper station was established at Molai.

In 1966, the Church of Christ in Nigeria was formed. Later, the name Church of Christ in Nations was adopted.

== Ministries and activities ==
COCIN is involved in various social and educational activities. It operates secondary schools for boys and girls, teacher training colleges, a theological college, vocational institutes, a hospital and a school for the blind. In 2021, the church opened Karl Kumm University in Vom, Jos South.

== Religious persecution ==
In the late 2010s and early 2020s, COCIN faced significant persecution. In 2023, due to violence by extremist Islamic groups, the denomination was forced to close over 70 churches.

== Ecumenical affiliations ==
COCIN is a member of the Fellowship of Churches of Christ in Nigeria.

According to the church's website, it would be a member of the World Council of Churches (WCC), World Alliance of Reformed Churches (WARC) and Reformed Ecumenical Council (REC). However, the denomination is not listed as a member by the WCC. The WARC and REC merged in 2010, forming the current World Communion of Reformed Churches (WCRC). However, COCIN is also not on the list of WCRC members.

== See also ==
- Christianity in Nigeria
