= Nigerian Baptist Convention =

Baptist Christian denomination

- Abbreviation: NBC
- Classification: Protestant
- Orientation: Baptist
- Theology: Evangelical Baptist
- President/CEO: Rev. Dr. Israel Adélaní Àkànjí
- Associations: WCC
- Headquarters: Ibadan, Nigeria
- Origin: 1914; Ibadan
- Congregations: 14,678
- Members: 9,015,000
- Tertiary institutions: Bowen University
- Seminaries: 9
- Official website: nigerianbaptist.org

Nigerian Baptist Convention is a Baptist Christian denomination, affiliated with the Baptist World Alliance, in Nigeria. The office headquarters is in Ibadan, Nigeria. Rev. Dr. Israel Adélaní Àkànjí MFA is the president.

== History ==
The Nigerian Baptist Convention has its origins in an American mission of the International Mission Board in 1849 with the appointment of Rev. Thomas Jefferson Bowen as the first missionary to the country. He arrived in Badagry area of the current Lagos State on 5 August 1850. The Nigerian Baptist Convention was officially formed in 1914. It has started other Baptist conventions in West Africa notably the Ghana Baptist Convention and the Baptist Convention of Sierra Leone. According to a census published by the association in 2025, it claimed 14,678 churches and 9,015,000 members.

== Medical institutions ==
The Nigerian Baptist Convention also operates several hospitals and medical training institutions across the country. The Baptist Medical Centre in Ogbomoso, now called Bowen University Teaching Hospital, remains one of the leading hospitals and has been in use as a university teaching hospital by the Bowen University in Iwo, since December 2009. The Nigerian Baptist Convention operates other top flight Baptist medical centres (with Schools of Nursing and Midwifery) located in Eku and Saki; and several other minor Baptist hospitals across Nigeria. Others includes Oliveth Baptist Hospital, Oliveth heights, Oyo, Oyo State.

== Schools ==
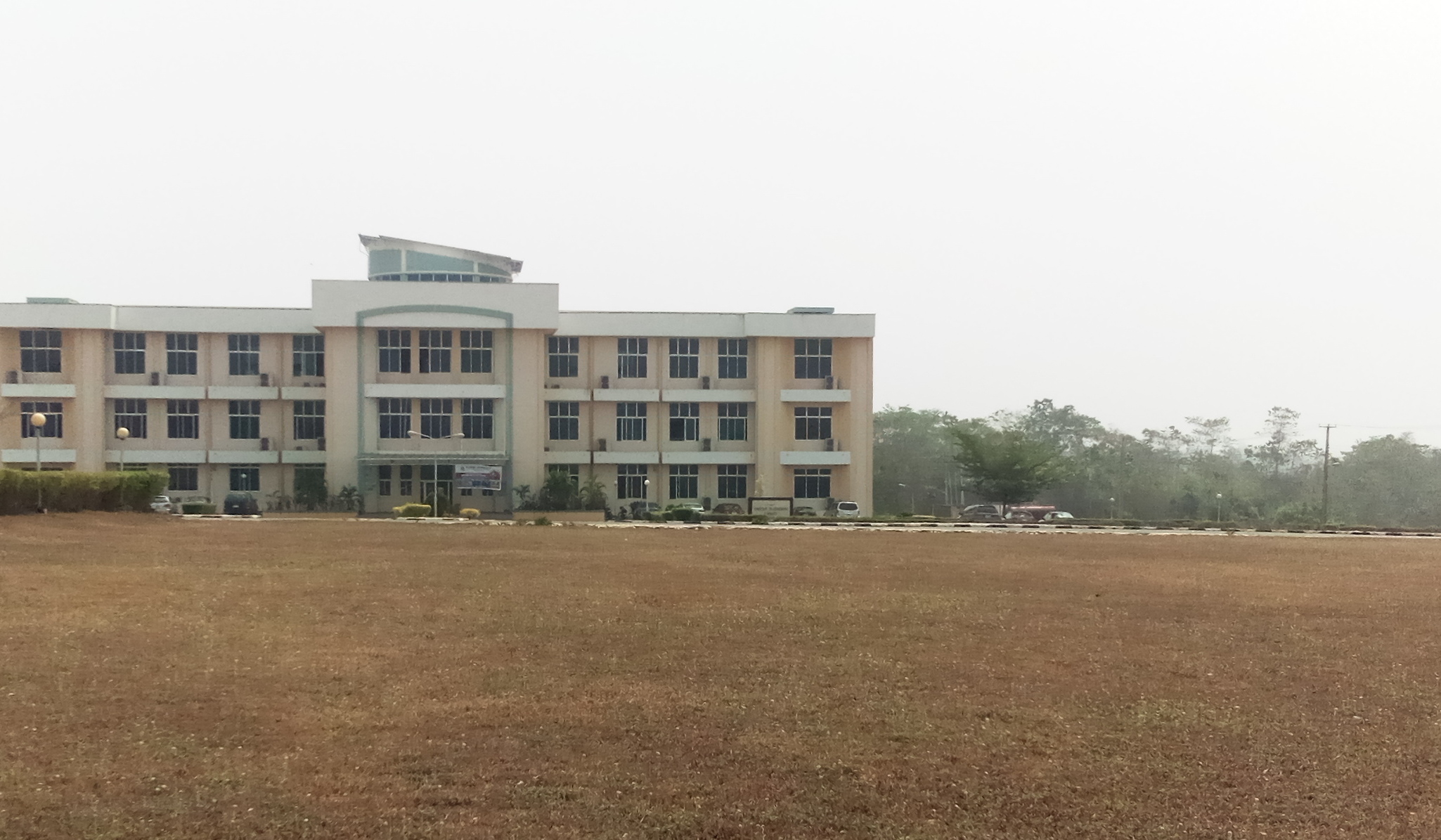
Timothy Olagbenro Library, Bowen University in Iwo.

The Convention has 15 affiliated primary and secondary schools, gathered in the Directorate of Baptist Mission Schools.

It has Bowen University, named in honor of Rev. Thomas Jefferson Bowen, the first American Baptist missionary to Nigeria from the Southern Baptist Convention. Bowen University is located at Iwo in Osun State. Bowen University opened in 2002 as a residential institution with 500 students with a current enrollment of about 3,000 students, and a target capacity of at least 5,500 students. The idea of a Nigerian Baptist university was conceived in 1938, and endorsed in 1957 by the Nigerian Baptist Convention. Bowen University is "conceived as a centre of learning and research of distinction, combining academic excellence with love of humanity, borne out of a God-fearing attitude, in accordance with the Baptist tradition of ethical behavior, social responsibility and democratic ethos".

== Theological institutions ==
The Nigerian Baptist Convention operates ten theological training centers for pastors, the largest being the Nigerian Baptist Theological Seminary founded in 1898 in Ogbomoso, which grants undergraduate, masters’ and doctoral degrees.

The theological institutions are:

- The Nigerian Baptist Theological Seminary, Ogbomoso
- Baptist Theological Seminary, Kaduna
- Baptist Theological Seminary, Eku
- Baptist College of Theology, Lagos
- Baptist College of Theology, Oyo
- Baptist College of Theology, Owerri
- Baptist College of Theology, Benin City
- Baptist College of Theology, Igede-Ekiti
- Baptist College of Theology, Jos
- Baptist Pastors' School, Gombe

== See also ==
- Bible
- Born again
- Baptist beliefs
- Jesus Christ
- Believers' Church
