= Organization of African Instituted Churches =

The Organization of African Instituted Churches (OAIC) is a Christian ecumenical organization founded in 1978. It is a member of the World Council of Churches. It describes itself as "the representative body that brings together African Independent and Instituted Churches (AICs), offers them a forum for sharing their concerns and hopes, and enables churches to minister effectively to the needs of their members and their communities."
