= Fraternidad Cristiana de Guatemala =

- Fraternidad Cristiana de Guatemala
- 14.5921°N 90.5791°W
- Location: Mixco
- Country: Guatemala
- Churchmanship: Evangelicalism, Pentecostalism
- Website: frater.org

History
- Founded: 1979
- Founder: Dr. Jorge H. Lopez

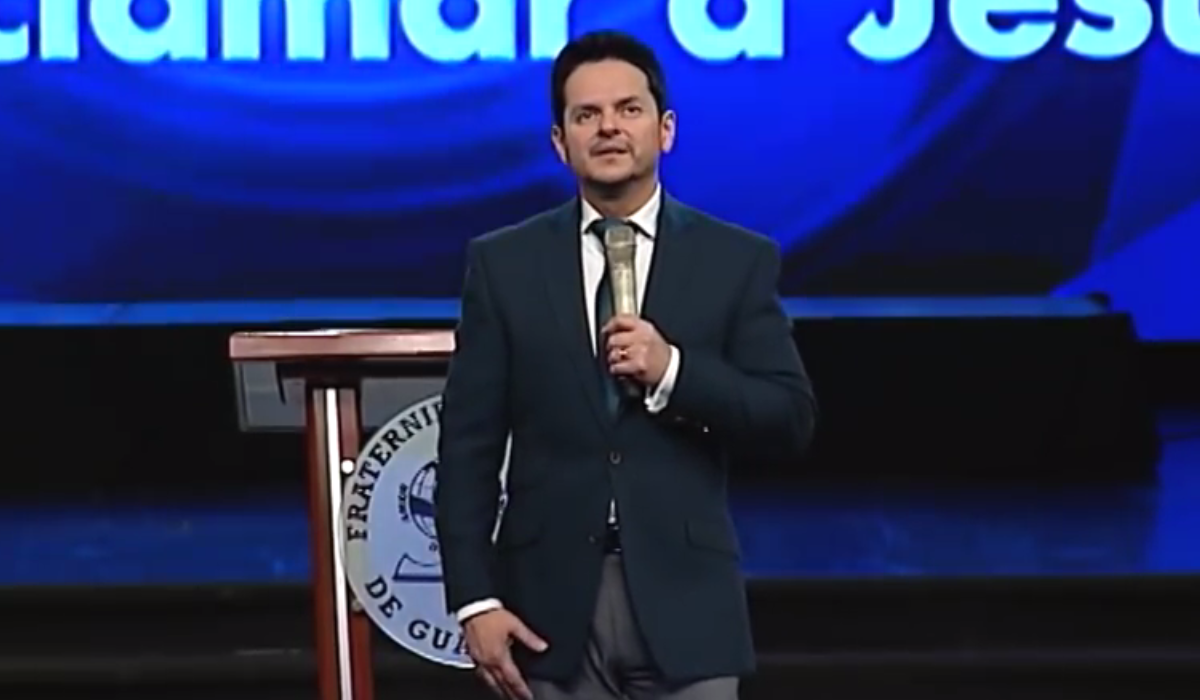

Fraternidad Cristiana de Guatemala (or Mega Frater) is an evangelical pentecostal megachurch, in Mixco (Ciudad San Cristóbal), Guatemala. The senior pastor of this community is Dr. Jorge H. Lopez. In 2016, the attendance was 20,000 people.

== History ==
The church was founded in 1979 by Dr. Jorge H. Lopez with 20 people. In 2007, the new building was inaugurated. In 2007, the weekly attendance was 12,000 people. In 2017, the church had 20,000 people.

== Building ==
Construction of the building began in 2001. After 6 years of construction, it was inaugurated in 2007. The auditorium has 12,300 seats.

== See also ==
- List of the largest evangelical churches
- List of the largest evangelical church auditoriums
