= Comunidad Cristiana Agua Viva =

- Location: Lima
- Country: Peru
- Churchmanship: Evangelicalism, Evangelical charismatic movement
- Website: ccaguaviva.com

History
- Founded: 1985
- Founder(s): Peter Hornung and Mirta

Comunidad Cristiana Agua Viva is a charismatic evangelical megachurch in Lima, Peru. As of 2017, it has seven locations in Lima Province.

== History ==
Agua Viva was founded in 1985 by Juan Capurro and Alicia. In 2007, Sergio Hornung and Carla became senior pastors. In 2008, the church bought the Coliseo Amauta, a stadium with 18,000 seats. In 2025, the Church had 42,000 people.

== Beliefs ==
The beliefs of the church are identified as part of Evangelical Christianity, currently part of the charismatic movement.

== Locations ==
- Lima District
- Lurigancho-Chosica
- Lince District
- Los Olivos District
- San Juan de Lurigancho
- San Juan de Miraflores
- Villa María del Triunfo
- Surco

== See also ==
- List of the largest evangelical churches
- List of the largest evangelical church auditoriums
