= New Life Assembly of God =

- Location: Chennai
- Country: India
- Denomination: Pentecostal
- Website: nlag.in

History
- Founded: 1973
- Founder: David Mohan

New Life Assembly of God is an evangelical megachurch affiliated with the General Council of the Assemblies of God of India, in Chennai, India, current Pentecostal. The senior pastor of this community is David Mohan. In 2020, the attendance is 35000 people.

== History ==
The church was founded in 1973 by Pastor David Mohan. In 1999, the church added a service in English, led by Pastor Chadwick Mohan, the son of Pastor David. In 2004, attendance reached 30,000 people. In 2011, it hosted the International Congress of the Assemblies of God. In 2016, NLAG hosted the Centenary of the General Council of the Assemblies of God of India on YMCA grounds with World leaders, Evangelists, and Missionaries. In 2020, the Church had 35000 permanent members and 100,000 non permanent members.

== Outreach ==
The church has medical sponsorship activities in the surrounding rural villages of Chennai.

== See also ==
- List of the largest evangelical churches
- List of the largest evangelical church auditoriums
