= Salem Baptist Church (Chicago) =

Coordinates: 41°41′17.0″N 87°36′13.7″W

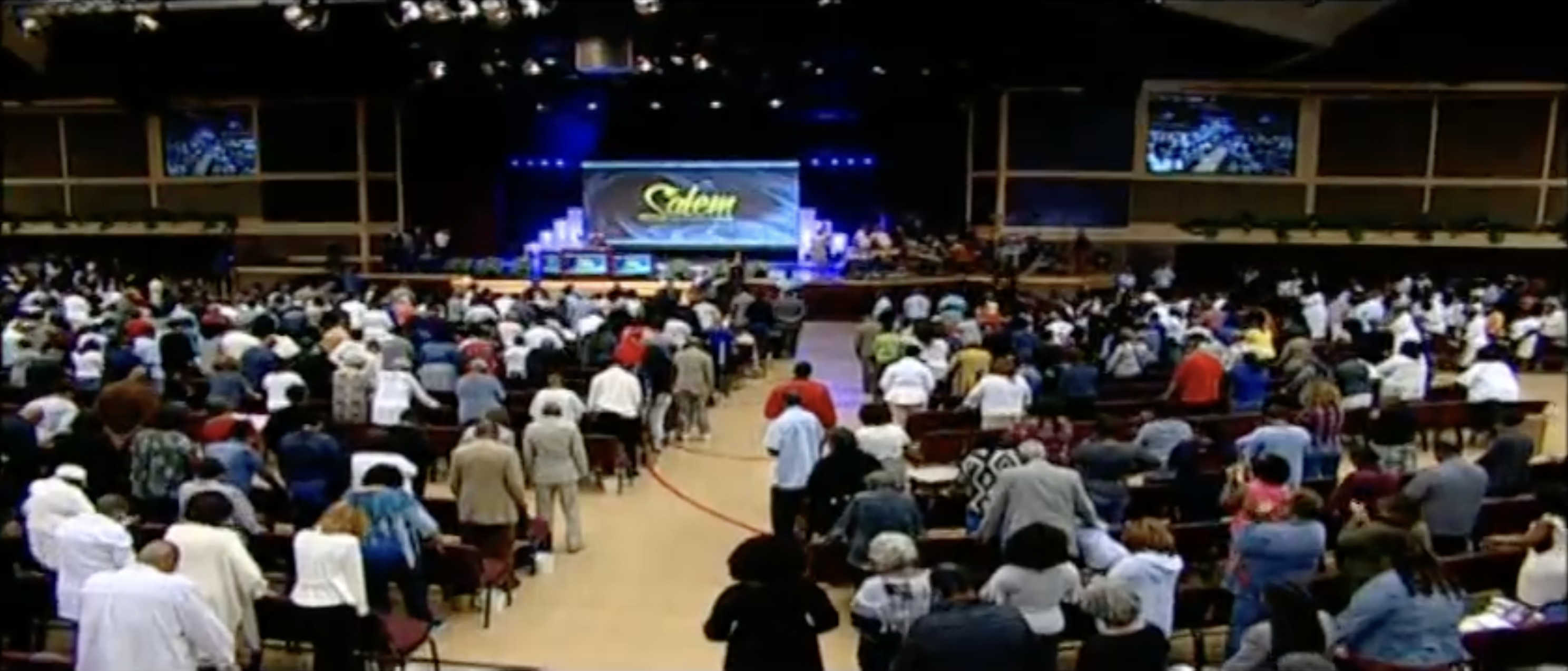
- Salem Baptist Church
- Location: 752 East 114th Street; Chicago, Illinois
- Country: United States
- Denomination: Baptist
- Website: salemchicago.org

History
- Founded: 1985
- Founder: James Meeks

The Salem Baptist Church is a Baptist megachurch located at 752 E 114th Street in the Pullman neighborhood of Chicago, Illinois, United States. The senior pastor is Charlie Dates.

== History ==
In 1985, James Meeks, pastor of Beth Eden Baptist Church in Chicago, shared the vision of founding a new church in a sermon. After a meeting with 205 members that same day, the church was founded.

The new congregation held its first services January 20, 1985 at 8201 South Jeffrey Boulevard and remained at this location for five-years.

In 2004, it had 17,000 members. On January 8, 2023, after 38 years of service Pastor Meeks retired, Charlie Dates succeeded him as senior pastor.

In April 2023, GLAAD pointed out that Meeks had in fact made homophobic remarks at the church during his time as head pastor.

== House of Hope ==
In 2005, it dedicated the House of Hope, a new building including a 10,000-seat auditorium. The venue has 203,000 sq ft (19,000 m^{2}) of usable space.

On March 6, 2026, the House of Hope provided a celebration of life service for Rev. Jesse Jackson.

== See also ==
- List of the largest churches in the USA
- List of the largest evangelical churches
- List of the largest evangelical church auditoriums
