= New Life Fellowship Association =

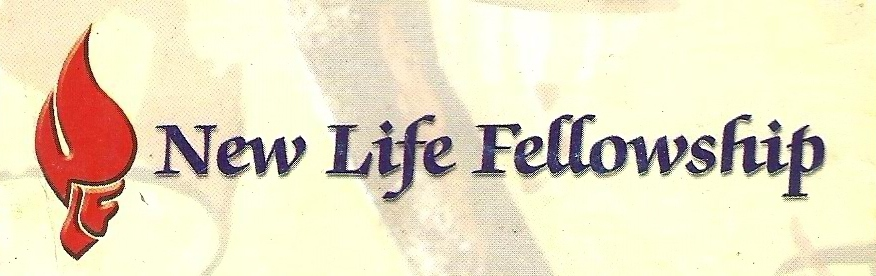
- New Life Fellowship
- Classification: Evangelicalism
- Orientation: Charismatic
- Moderator: Shekhar Kallianpur, senior pastor
- Region: India
- Official website: nlfa.org

New Life Fellowship Association, commonly known as New Life Fellowship (NLF), is a group of megachurches primarily located in India, that is characterised by adherence to the Holiness movement, Evangelicalism, and Biblical fundamentalism. New Life Fellowship Association Mumbai (Bombay) is a megachurch with 70,000 members.

== History ==
New Life Fellowship was founded in 1964 in Pune by missionaries Graham and Pamela Truscott from the New Life Churches of New Zealand. In 1966, the church was established in Mumbai. Dr. S. Joseph joined the Church in Mumbai and was soon ordained Pastor and became the founding chairman of New Life Fellowship. In India, it has more than 100,000 adherents. In 2025, the Church had 70,000 people.

== Beliefs ==
The denomination has a charismatic confession of faith.

== Bibliography ==
- Brett Knowles: New Life: The New Life Churches of New Zealand: 1942-1979: Dunedin: Third Millennium: 1999:ISBN 1-877139-15-7

== See also ==
- List of the largest evangelical megachurches
- Born Again Movement
- Christianity in India
