= Harper High School (Chicago) =

Public high school in Chicago, Illinois, United States

Location
- 6520 S. Wood Street; Chicago, Illinois 60636; United States; 41.7750°N 87.6697°W

Information
- School type: Public; Secondary
- Motto: "Focus on today, Preparing for tomorrow."
- Opened: 1911
- Status: Closed
- Closed: June 30, 2021
- School district: Chicago Public Schools
- CEEB code: 140855
- Principal: Leonetta C. Sanders (2020–2021)
- Grades: 9–12
- Gender: Coed
- Enrollment: 19 (2020–2021; final graduating class of seniors)
- Campus type: Urban
- Colors: White; Red
- Athletics conference: Chicago Public League
- Team name: Cardinals
- Accreditation: North Central Association of Colleges and Schools
- Yearbook: Shield

William Rainey Harper High School was a public 4-year high school located in the West Englewood neighborhood on the south side of Chicago, Illinois, United States. Opened in 1911, Harper was part of the Chicago Public Schools district. Harper served students in West Englewood and certain streets of Chicago Lawn, and was noted as the oldest high school in the West Englewood neighborhood. Harper closed at the end of the 2020–2021 school year on June 30, 2021.

== History ==
Opened in 1911 by the Chicago Public Schools district and Chicago Board of Education, The school was named in honor of William Rainey Harper (1856–1906), a legendary educator who served as president of both the University of Chicago and Bradley University and who was a champion of modernizing the facilities and standardizing the academic curriculum of the Chicago Public Schools. The majority of the school's students were African-American after rezoning in the early 1970s. In 2008, Harper was the first public school in Chicago to be a part of the Turnaround project started by former Chicago Public Schools CEO Arne Duncan. Harper High School was a non-selective enrollment high school with attendance boundaries. Students within the attendance boundary were immediately enrolled without a form of admission. Those outside of the boundary had to receive permission from the school to enroll. If there are more applications than spots available, the school would perform a computerized lottery. Harper High School had formed a program called "B.A.G." which the letters stands for Behavior, Attendance and Grades. Additionally, The school was adopted by BET Networks as a 100-year anniversary in 2011.

=== National attention ===
On April 11, 2006, Harper High School gained national attention when the school was featured on The Oprah Winfrey Show. The show discussed Harper High School's lack of computers and other essential learning tools for its students. An updated episode was aired on September 24, 2010 about the school's turnaround project.

On July 9, 2012, Harper High School was the focus of a 2012 WBEZ report concerning the 29 past and present students who were casualties of gun violence in the preceding 13 months. The school was subsequently the subject of a two-episode, five-month immersive investigation by This American Life that aired on February 15 and 22, 2013, focusing on gun violence and the lives of students; the series earned a Peabody Award.

On April 22, 2013, two Harper senior students; Deonte Tanner and Brittney Knight, won Bill Gates Millennium Scholarships. They were the first students in Chicago school history to do so.

On October 29, 2014, School officials reported that 5 people at Harper High School in Chicago's West Englewood neighborhood were taken to different hospitals after they became ill because of the odor. Fire department officials said they have tested carbon monoxide levels in the school, but found them to be quite low. Instead, a fire department spokesman says the smell appears to be coming from sewer gas, and sanitation crews had been doing work. Students and staff were taken to other schools while the Chicago Fire Department investigated the cause of the odor. They also shut the boiler down in the school as a serious precaution.

=== Phasing out and closing ===
On February 12, 2018, the Chicago Board of Education decided to phase out and ultimately close Harper along with three other neighborhood high schools due to numerous reasons including low–enrollment, poor academic performance, lack of courses offerings for students and operational costs of the buildings. Harper graduated its final class of 19 seniors and closed after the 2020–2021 school year on June 30, 2021.

== Athletics ==
Harper competed in the Chicago Public League (CPL) and was a member of the Illinois High School Association (IHSA). Harper sports teams were nicknamed Cardinals. The boys' basketball team was in Class 2A and 3A to become the four time regional champions. (2008–09, 2009–10, 2010–11, 2015–16). The chess team was in Class AA only once and finished in 8th place. (1975–76). The boys' football team was in Class 3A, 4A, 5A and 6A, and qualified for state finals twenty-four times. (1984–85, 1985–86, 1986–87, 1990–91, 1992–93, 1993–94, 1994–95, 1995–96, 1996–97, 1997–98, 1998–99, 2000–01, 2001–02, 2002–03, 2003–04, 2004–05, 2005–06, 2007–08, 2008–09, 2010–11, 2011–12, 2012–13, 2013–14, 2014–15). 2019–20 was Harper's 108th and final football season before closing in Summer 2021.

== Notable alumni ==
- Cal Lepore – (attended), former NFL referee (1966–1980)
- John Kennedy – (Class of 1959), former MLB baseball player (1962–1974)
- James Meeks – (Class of 1974), founder and senior pastor of Salem Baptist Church, and former Democratic member of the Illinois Senate
- Wayne Smith – (Class of 1975), former NFL football player (1980–1987)
- Carl McDowell (Actor) Carl D. McDowell - (Class of 1996),
