= Nginden Bethany Church =

Megachurch in Indonesia

Coordinates: 7.3070°S 112.7725°E

- Graha Bethany Nginden
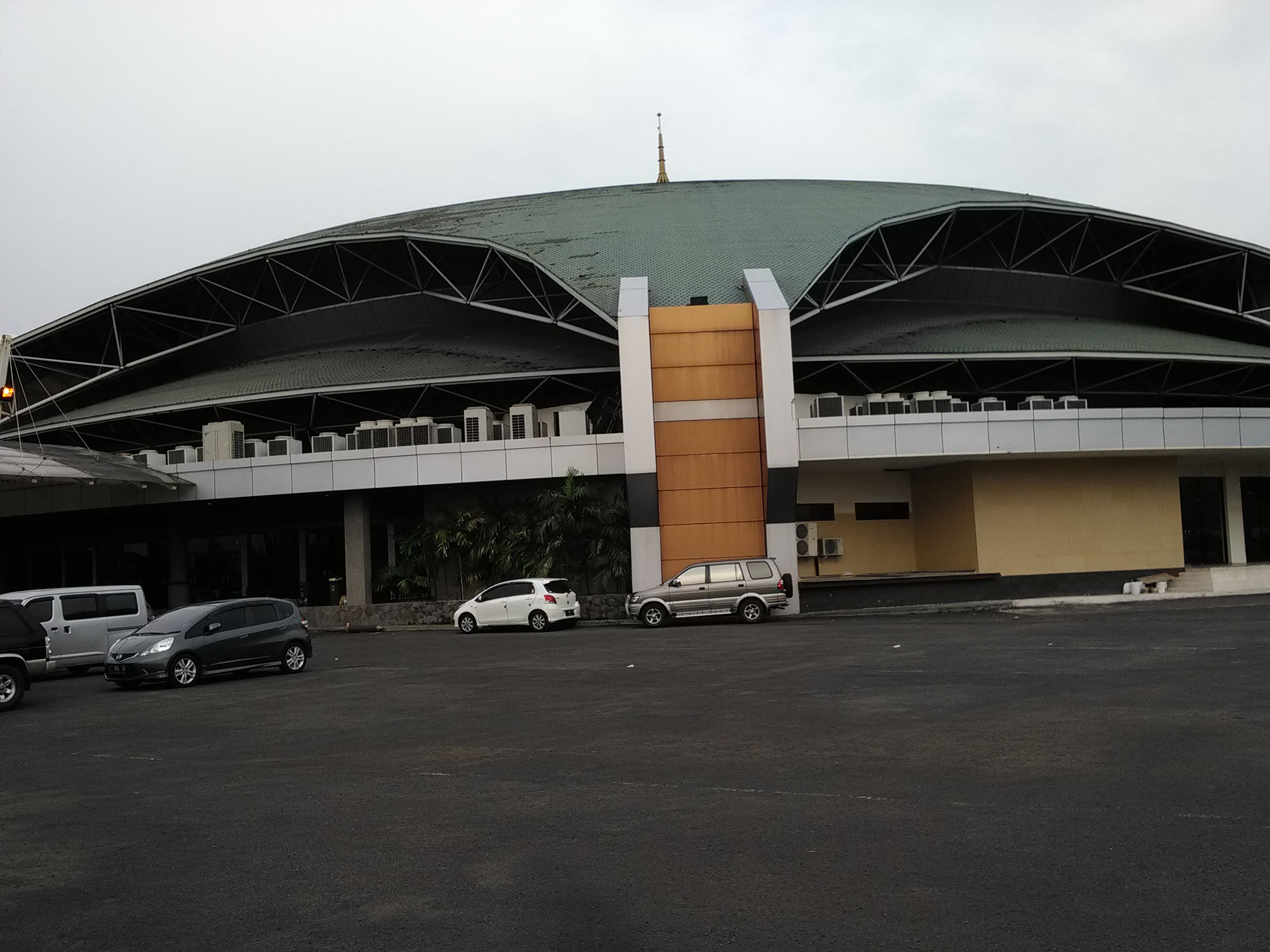
- Bethany Church Building, 2018
- Nginden Bethany Church
- Location: Jl. Nginden Intan Timur I No.29, Nginden Jangkungan, Kec. Sukolilo, Surabaya, East Java 60118
- Country: Indonesia
- Denomination: Evangelicalism, Charismatic Christianity, Neo-charismatic movement
- Website: gerejabethany.org

History
- Status: Church
- Founded: 1977
- Founder: Pdt. Abraham Alex Tanuseputra

Specifications
- Capacity: 35,000

Clergy
- Pastor: Christoffel Abraham da Costa

Nginden Bethany Church (Indonesian: Graha Bethany Nginden) is an evangelical megachurch affiliated with Bethany Indonesian Church in Surabaya, Indonesia. The senior pastor of this community is Pdt. David Aswin Tanuseputra since 2012, replacing his father Pdt. Abraham Alex Tanuseputra. In 2020, the attendance is 140,000 people.

== History ==
The church was founded in 1977 by Pastor Abraham Alex Tanuseputra. It included his family and 7 people. By 1987, the Church had 2,000 members. It was a member of the Indonesian Bethel Church (Church of God (Cleveland, Tennessee)) until 2003, when the regional section Bethany Indonesian Church became independent. In 2000, the church inaugurated a 20,000-seat temple that will reach 35,000 places after renovations, in 2009.

In 2025, the Church had 140,000 people.

== Humanitarian implication ==
Graha Bethany Nginden founded Bethany Care, a health center open to everyone that assists the needy and works frequently with the Red Cross.

== Educational institutions ==
Bethany Nginden Church has a Playground-Kindergarten-Elementary school under the name Bethany Christian School (BCS), which was founded in 2017.

== See also ==
- List of the largest evangelical churches
- List of the largest evangelical church auditoriums
