= List of the largest evangelical church auditoriums =

Largest evangelical Church auditoriums

This is a list of the largest evangelical church auditoriums. The list is based on the human seating capacity of the evangelical church auditoriums.

== Characteristics ==
The building of an Evangelical Christian megachurch has a main auditorium for worship services, as well as additional rooms for children and teenagers, small groups and sometimes a cafeteria or a gym.

== Criteria for inclusion ==
- Only church auditoriums are included in this list. Church tents, canopies and overflows are included in the list. For example, the Redeemed Christian Church of God 12 million-capacity church campground meets this criterion as it is a completely enclosed building.
- The figures are based on seating capacity of the auditorium from weekly services.
- The estimates are based on human seating capacity in a single service. Churches with multiple consecutive services will be for only one service. For example, Faith Tabernacle, which holds four services every Sunday in its 50,000 capacity auditorium will be included as having 50,000 and not 200,000 in the list.
- Only auditoriums with a capacity of 10,000 and above are to be included.

== List ==
| Church | Association | Year completed | Capacity | Location |
|---|---|---|---|---|
| Hand of God Cathedral | Salvation Ministries | 2026 | 120,000 | Port Harcourt, Nigeria |
| The Ark | Living Faith Church Worldwide | Under construction | 109,345 | Ota, Ogun Nigeria |
| Glory Dome | Dunamis International Gospel Centre | 2018 | 100,000 | Abuja, Nigeria |
| Champions Royal Assembly Abuja | Champions Royal Assembly | 2015 | 80,000 | Abuja, Nigeria |
| Temple of the Glory of God | God is Love Pentecostal Church | 2004 | 60,000 | São Paulo, Brazil |
| Faith Tabernacle | Living Faith Church Worldwide | 1999 | 50,000 | Lagos, Nigeria |
| Nginden Bethany Church | Bethany Indonesian Church | 2000, 2009 | 35,000 | Surabaya, Indonesia |
| International Gospel Centre | Word of Life Bible Church | 2014 | 35,000 | Warri, Nigeria |
| United Family International Church Chitungwiza | United Family International Church | 2022 | 30,000 | Chitungwiza, Zimbabwe |
| Deeper Life Bible Church Lagos | Deeper Christian Life Ministry | 2018 | 30,000 | Lagos, Nigeria |
| Great Temple | General Convention of the Assemblies of God in Brazil (Assemblies of God) | 1996 | 22,000 | Cuiabá, Brazil |
| Calvary Temple | Non-denominational | 2013 | 18,000 | Hyderabad, India |
| Lakewood Church Central Campus, Lakewood Church | Non-denominational | 2005 | 16,000 | Houston, United States |
| Liberty Worship Centre | Non-denominational | 2014 | 15,000 | Kampala, Uganda |
| Perez Dome | Perez Chapel International | 2011 | 14,000 | Accra, Ghana |
| Mega Frater | Fraternidad Cristiana de Guatemala | 2007 | 12,200 | Mixco, Guatemala |
| Church of the Nations/Bethel Israel Tabernacle | International Evangelism Center - African Interior Mission | 2020 | 12,000 | Ouagadougou, Burkina Faso |
| Winners Chapel Nairobi | Living Faith Church Worldwide | 2013 | 12,000 | Nairobi, Kenya |
| Holy Stadium, Gospel of the Kingdom Church | Indonesian Christian Congregation (Mennonite World Conference) | 2005 | 12,000 | Semarang, Indonesia |
| Yoido Full Gospel Church | Assemblies of God | 1973 | 12,000 | Seoul, South Korea |
| World Cathedral of Faith | Universal Church of the Kingdom of God | 1999 | 11,000 | Rio de Janeiro, Brazil |
| Miracle Centre Cathedral | Non-denominational | 2004 | 10,500 | Kampala, Uganda |
| Faith Dome, Crenshaw Christian Center | Non-denominational | 1989 | 10,145 | Crenshaw, Los Angeles, United States |
| Iglesia Portal del Cielo | Non-denominational | 2025 | 10,000 | Resistencia, Chaco, Argentina |
| Konyak Baptist Church Mon | Nagaland Baptist Church Council (Baptist World Alliance) | 2023 | 10,000 | Mon, Nagaland, India |
| Noah's Ark Auditorium | Full Life Christian Centre | 2015 | 10,000 | Uyo, Nigeria |
| Temple of Solomon (São Paulo) | Universal Church of the Kingdom of God | 2014 | 10,000 | São Paulo, Brazil |
| Christ's Commission Fellowship Pasig | Christ's Commission Fellowship | 2014 | 10,000 | Pasig, Philippines |
| Redeemed Christian Church of God (Greenville, Texas) | Redeemed Christian Church of God | 2013 | 10,000 | Floyd, Texas, United States (Note: The Greenville address is the mailing address, as Floyd is an unincorporated community with no post office.) |
| The Rock Cathedral | House On The Rock Church | 2013 | 10,000 | Lagos, Nigeria |
| National Temple | The Apostolic Church Nigeria | 2011 | 10,000 | Lagos, Nigeria |
| Family Worship Center | Assemblies of God | 2009 | 10,000 | Asunción, Paraguay |
| House of Hope, Salem Baptist Church of Chicago | Baptist | 2005 | 10,000 | Chicago, United States |
| Indonesian Bethel Church, Rose of Sharon Church Jakarta | Indonesian Bethel Church (Church of God (Cleveland, Tennessee)) | 2003 | 10,000 | Jakarta, Indonesia |

== See also ==
- List of the largest evangelical churches
- Dedication of churches

== Notes ==
The Apostolic Church, located in Ketu, Olorunda has a sitting capacity of 100,000 worshippers and was commissioned in 2011.
