= James Meeks =

American politician (born 1956)

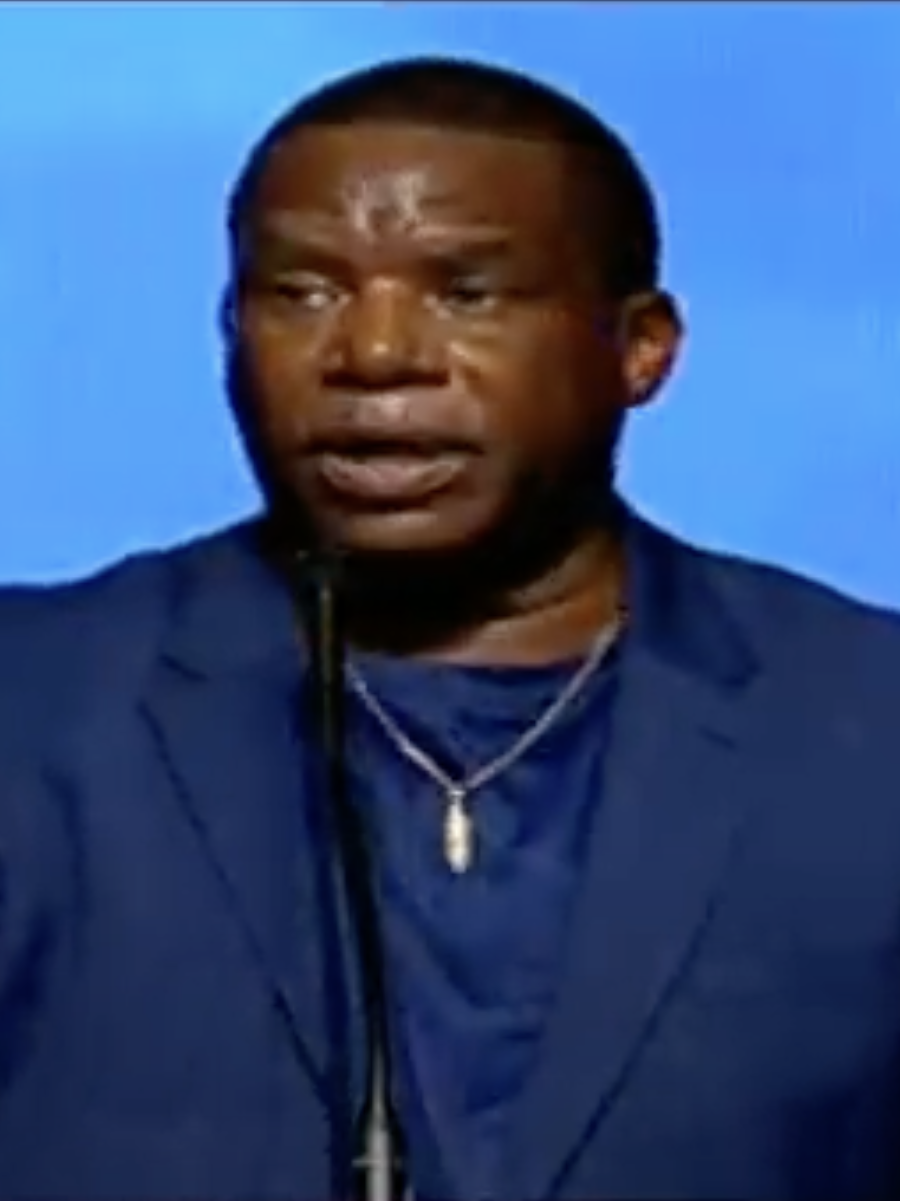
- Meeks in 2022

Chairman of the Illinois State Board of Education
- In office January 21, 2015 – 2019
- Appointed by: Bruce Rauner
- Preceded by: Gery Chico
- Succeeded by: Darren Reisberg

Member of the Illinois Senate from the 15th district
- In office January 8, 2003 – January 9, 2013
- Preceded by: Bill Shaw
- Succeeded by: Napoleon Harris

Personal details
- Born: August 4, 1956 (age 70) Chicago, Illinois
- Party: Democratic
- Spouse: Jamell Meeks
- Education: Bishop College (B.A.)
- Profession: Minister (Baptist)

James T. Meeks (born August 4, 1956) is a Baptist minister and past member of the Illinois Senate, who represented the 15th district from 2003 to 2013. While a Senator, he chaired the Illinois Legislative Black Caucus. He briefly campaigned for mayor of Chicago in the 2003 and 2011 election, before dropping out of the race both times. He subsequently become a leading figure in the campaign to oppose same-sex marriage in Illinois.

Meeks was appointed chair of the Illinois State Board of Education by Governor Bruce Rauner and took office January 21, 2017. He succeeded Gery Chico who had resigned the previous week.

== Early life ==
James T. Meeks was born August 4, 1956, to parents who came to Chicago as part of the Great Migration. Meeks was raised in Englewood, near West 64th Street and South Laflin Street. After graduating from Harper High School, Meeks continued his education at Bishop College in Dallas, where he earned a degree in Religion and Philosophy.

== Ministry ==
In 1980, he became pastor of Beth Eden Baptist Church in Chicago. In 1985, Meeks, still pastor of Beth Eden Baptist Church, shared the vision of founding a new church in a sermon. After a meeting with 205 members that same day, he founded the Salem Baptist Church.

The new congregation held its first services January 20, 1985 at 8201 South Jeffrey Boulevard and remained at this location for five years. In 2005, he inaugurated the House of Hope, a 10,000-seat facility. The venue has 203,000 sq ft (19,000 m^{2}) of usable space.

In 2023, he stepped down as senior pastor. In his post-minister life, he has become a non-profit, affordable housing developer in Kensington. On March 6, 2026, however, Meeks would again provide ministry services when he officiated the Celebration of Life memorial service for Rev. Jesse Jackson at the House of Hope.

=== Controversy ===
LGBTQ advocacy group GLAAD noted in April 2023 that during his ministry career, Meeks in fact made homophobic claims. Such incidents included Meeks claiming in 2013 that “Men should not be marrying men, and women should not be marrying women…. God does not support homosexuality, and neither do I” and having his church operate a "Halloween Fright Night" on October 31, 2006 where he claimed "A fenced-in cell housed a few denizens of ‘hell,’ including a pedophile trolling the Internet for a young victim, a meditating Buddhist, and two mincing young men wearing body glitter who were supposed to be homosexuals.” Meeks also told his congregation in April 2006, during the time considering a run for Governor, that “If I do run and there are two people in the race who both are not standing for morality, if I don’t have every white Christian vote in the state of Illinois, I will stand on top of the Sears Tower and call every one of ya’ll racist.”

== Political career ==
In 2002, Meeks became the first state senator to be elected as an independent. He unseated Democratic incumbent William Shaw, and had been encouraged to run by the Shaw's political rival, Jesse Jackson Jr. Meeks won re-election in 2006 as a Democrat. In November 2011, he announced that he would not seek reelection when his current term ended in January 2013.

In 1998, Meeks led a movement to "dry up" Roseland Community by collecting votes to close 26 liquor stores. He also created a mentoring program called "It Takes a Village " which provides support and assistance to pregnant youth and young mothers.

Meeks was also concerned with issues of housing affordability. He sponsored a bill which would make permanent a 2003 Executive Order that established a task force to develop Annual Comprehensive Housing Plans to address critical housing issues. The bill focuses its attention on vulnerable groups, including those at risk of homelessness and low income people with disabilities.

Another bill sponsored by Meeks addressed law enforcement and racial profiling. The bill would allow police departments to apply for grants to purchase cameras for police cars. Meeks believes that cameras in police cars protects everyone involved in a traffic stop, arguing that it provides security for both the driver and the law enforcement officer, and that it may also help reduce instances of racial profiling.

Meeks was the chairperson of the Housing and Community Affairs Committee and Vice Chairperson of the Commerce and Economic Development Committee. Additionally, he was a member of the Senate Commerce; Appropriations I; Education; Higher Education; and Senate Education Funding Reform Committees.

During his speech supporting the removal of Rod Blagojevich from office, Meeks reprised the governor's now-infamous quote about Barack Obama's Senate seat, saying, "We have this thing called impeachment and it's bleeping golden, and we've used it the right way."

Meeks was a leading and outspoken figure in the 2013 campaign to stop same-sex marriage legalization in Illinois.

=== Education reform ===
In fall 2008, he announced a boycott of the Chicago Public Schools, urging his congregants and people from other churches to keep their children home until Chicago inner-city schools received more funding from Springfield. Meeks pointed out that at New Trier High School in Winnetka, thousands of dollars more are spent on each student, compared to Chicago Public Schools, where the population is mostly minorities from low-income homes. Over a thousand students met outside New Trier High School in the suburban North Shore to protest. The boycott ended after two days when governor Rod Blagojevich said he would not with Meeks during a boycott.

In 2009 and 2010, Meeks worked to pass opportunity scholarships for children in Chicago's worst-performing public schools. This effort was supported by a bipartisan coalition of legislators and outside groups such as the Illinois Policy Institute.

In 2015, he was elected chairman of the Illinois State Board of Education, serving until 2019.

=== Controversy ===
In November 2010, in an interview on the radio station WVON, Meeks advocated that only African Americans should be qualified for city contracts designated for minorities and women. During the conversation, he stated, "The word 'minority' from our standpoint should mean African American. I don't think women, Asians and Hispanics should be able to use that title. That's why our numbers cannot improve — because we use women, Asians and Hispanics who are not people of color, who are not people who have been discriminated against". He later retracted his statement by saying he would only forbid white women if elected mayor. He told television station WFLD, "I don't believe white women should be considered in that count ….You have white women in the category. They receive contracts. Then, white men receive contracts. Where does that leave everybody else"? The next day, Meeks released a written statement further elucidating his comments. It stressed that "all minority- and women-owned businesses" are entitled to their "fair share" of city contracts.

== Personal life ==
Meeks and his wife Jamell live in Chicago, Illinois and have four children: Jamie, Janet, Trent (Christina), and Jasmine, and one granddaughter and a grandson.
