= Guatemala City metropolitan area =

Coordinates: 14.6133°N 90.5353°W

- Metropolitan Area
- Zona Metropolitana de Ciudad de Guatemala (Spanish)
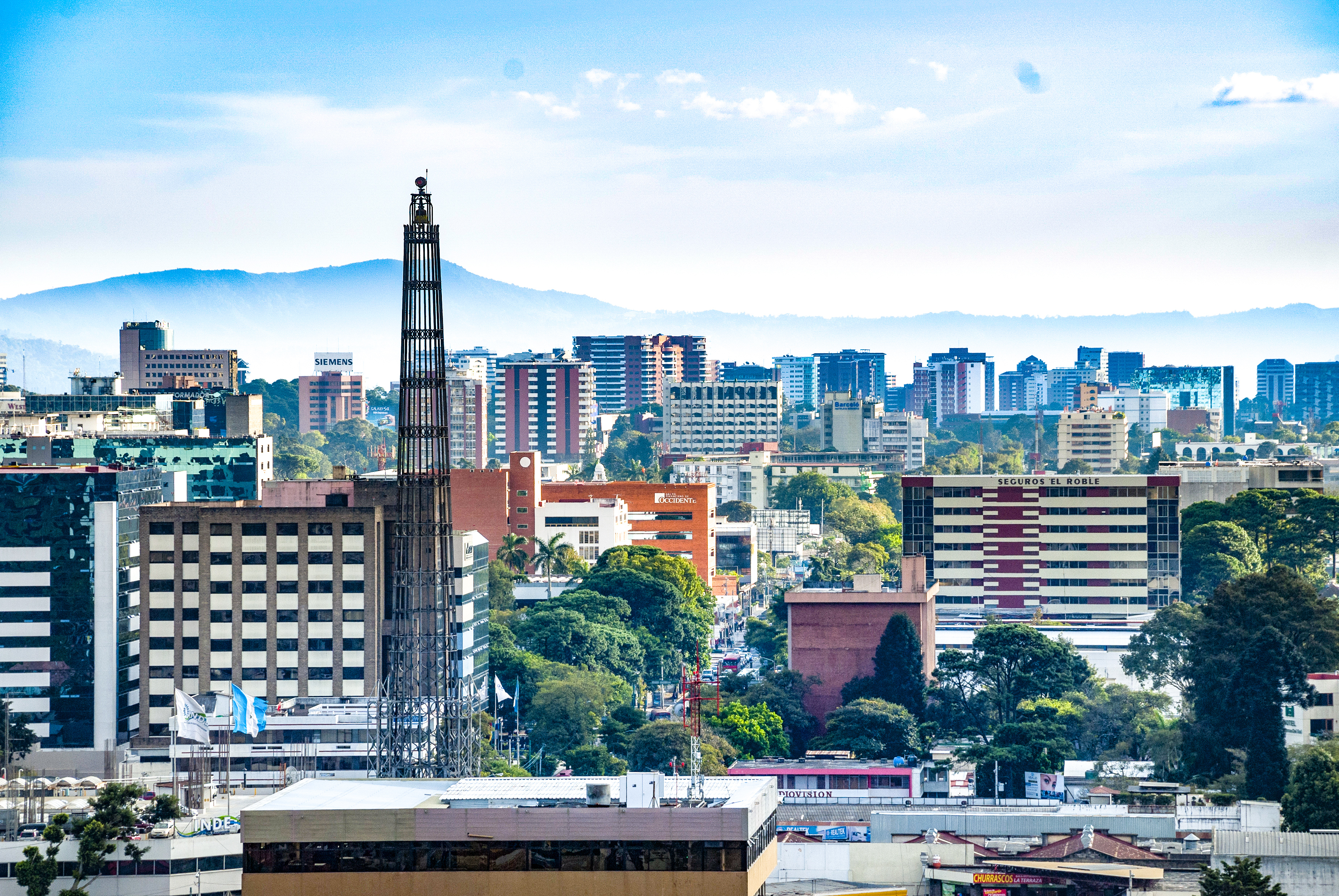
- Skyline Zone 14, Guatemala City
Interactive Map of Guatemala City Metropolitan Area
Guatemala City / Ciudad de Guatemala
Guatemala City Metropolitan Area / Zona Metropolitana
Guatemala Department / Departamento de Guatemala
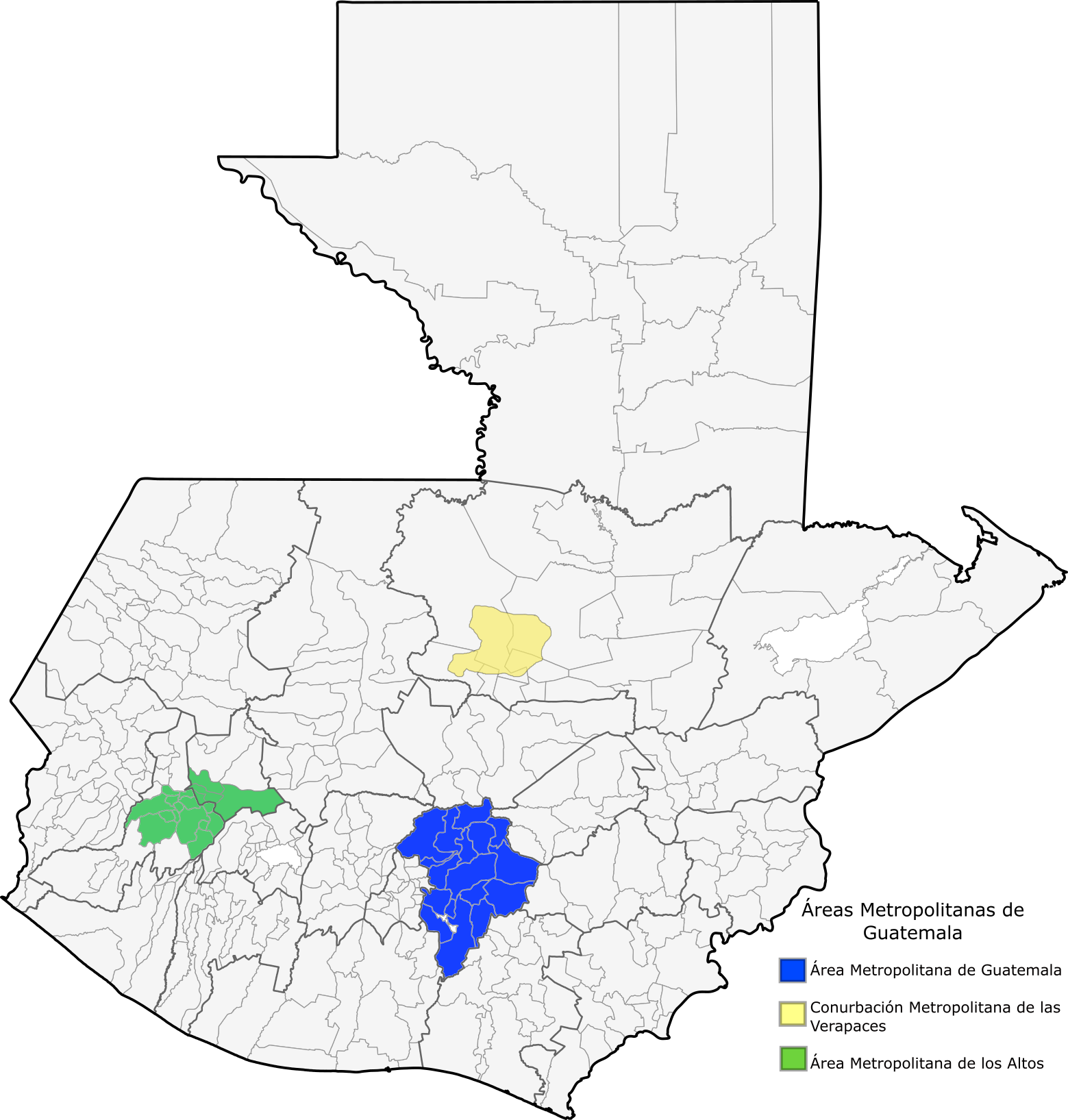
- Metropolitan area in blue
- Country: Guatemala
- Department(s): Guatemala Department
- Largest city: Guatemala City
- Other cities: Mixco; Villa Nueva; Santa Catarina Pinula

Population (2023)
  - Total: 3,430,852
- Time zone: UTC−6 (CST)

The Guatemala City metropolitan area (Área Metropolitana de Guatemala or AMG) is a conglomeration of densely populated municipalities surrounding Guatemala City. In 2005, the metropolitan area was defined by the governments of Guatemala and Guatemala City as comprising the municipalities of Amatitlán, Chinautla, Guatemala City, Mixco, San Miguel Petapa, Santa Catarina Pinula, Villa Canales and Villa Nueva. Together these eight municipalities cover 478 square kilometres and were projected by Guatemala's National Institute of Statistics to have a combined population of 2,749,161 in 2015.
