= Ciudad San Cristóbal =

Coordinates: 14°36′14″N 90°35′41″W

Colonia Ciudad San Cristóbal
- Colonia
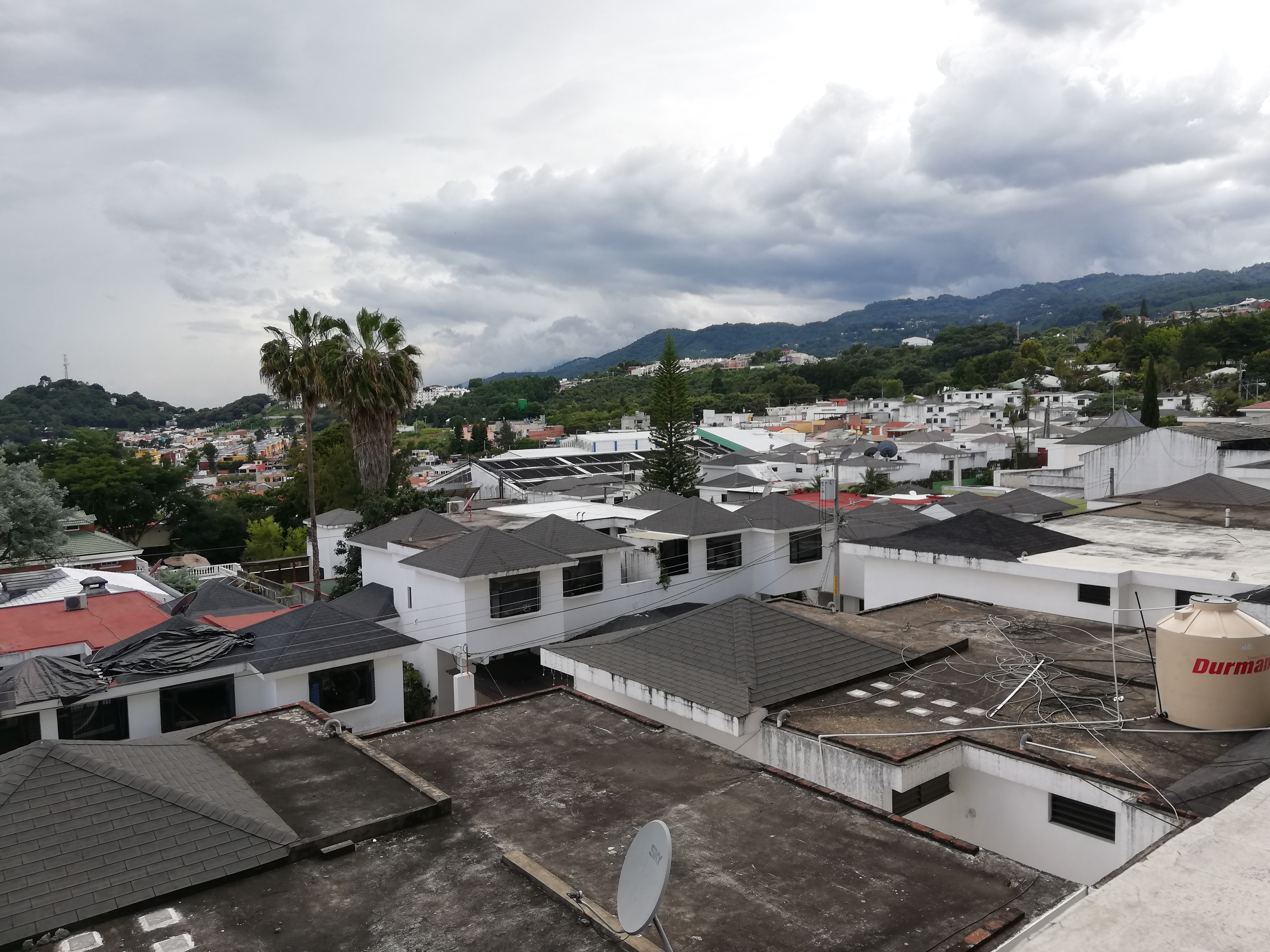
- Zona 8 Mixco
- Interactive map of Colonia Ciudad San Cristóbal
- Country: Guatemala
- Department: Guatemala Department
- Municipality: Mixco

Population (2018)
  - Total: 78,000

Ciudad San Cristóbal is a neighbourhood in the city of Mixco, and part of the department of Guatemala.

One of the biggest housing developments near Guatemala City, it was first developed by DEINCO, a major real estate company, in 1973. It spans over more than 10 square kilometers, separated from the capital by a canyon, which had made it previously very difficult to develop. DEINCO built a bridge, called the San Cristobal Bridge, to enable people to easily reach the new development from the city. At first only two lanes, the bridge was expanded to 4 lanes to accommodate the enormous amount of traffic going and coming from the city.

According to the 2002 population survey by the National Institute of Statistics, the entire Mixco municipality is home to more than 400,000 people. Of these, at least 150,000 live in Ciudad San Cristóbal.

Christian Academy of Guatemala is a private non-denominational Christian primary and secondary school, located in Ciudad San Cristóbal.

== See also ==
- List of Guatemala Cities
