= Bethany Indonesian Church =

Protestant church in Indonesia

Bethany Indonesian Church Gereja Bethany Indonesia
- The official logo
- Classification: Protestant
- Orientation: Evangelicalism, Charismatic, Pentecostal
- Theology: Charismatic
- Moderator: Aswin Tanuseputra
- Region: World
- Headquarters: Surabaya, Indonesia
- Founder: Abraham Alex Tanuseputra
- Origin: 2003; 23 years ago
- Official website: bethany.or.id

Bethany Indonesian Church (Indonesian: Gereja Bethany Indonesia) abbreviated as Bethany, an Evangelical charismatic Christian denomination and a megachurch. The headquarters is in Surabaya, Indonesia. It is led by Aswin Tanuseputra.

== History ==
The Indonesian Bethany Church Synod was established and officially recognized by the government through the Decree of the Director General of Christian Community Guidance, Ministry of Religion of the Republic of Indonesia No. DJ.III/Kep/HK 00.5/5/158/2003 on 17 January 2003, by Abraham Alex Tanuseputra. However, the history of the Bethany Church began decades before this church was established independently as a separate synod.

=== Initial establishment ===
In 1978, Bethany Church was founded by Rev. Prof. Dr. Abraham Alex Tanuseputra, at Jalan Manyar Rejo II/36-38, Surabaya. At that time the Bethany Church was incorporated as part of the Indonesian Bethel Church Synod (GBI) of (Church of God (Cleveland, Tennessee)), so it was referred to as "GBI Bethany Congregation" or "GBI Bethany". In shepherding the GBI Bethany Congregation, Rev. Prof. Dr. Abraham Alex Tanuseputra sparked "Successful Bethany Families" as the vision of the church.

=== Development ===
In 1985 a church building with a capacity of 3,500 people was started to be built as a place of worship for the Central Bethany Church on Jalan Manyar Rejo II/36-38, Surabaya and was completed in 1986. In 1987, the vision began to build Graha Bethany, Nginden, Surabaya with a capacity of 35,000 people completed in 2000.

In 1988, GBI Bethany Congregation sent Rev. Dr. Ir. Niko Njotorahardjo to open a local church (branch) in Jakarta. In 1989, GBI Bethany Congregation sent Rev. Dr. Ir. Timotius Arifin Tedjasukmana to open a local church (branch) in Denpasar, Bali. With the opening of these branches, GBI Bethany Congregation divided its services in Indonesia into the Bethany Congregation GBI in the western part of Indonesia led by Pdt. Dr. Ir. Niko Njotorahardjo; the central part of Indonesia led by Pdt. Dr. Yusak Hadisiswantoro, M.A. (son-in-law of Rev. Prof. DR. Abraham Alex Tanuseputra); and the eastern part of Indonesia led by Pdt. Dr. Ir. Timothy Arifin Tedjasukmana. As for Rev. Dr. Abraham Alex Tanuseputra the pioneer of the Bethany Church who is also the Senior Congregational Pastor at the church.

Until 2000, according to church statistics, it is claimed to have founded nearly 1,000 local GBI Bethany Congregations spread throughout Indonesia and abroad, with congregations reaching 250,000.

=== The complexity of the name of the congregation ===
In 1997 (and strengthened at the 2000 Synod Session) the Indonesian Bethel Church Synod (GBI) issued a decision that all local churches that are members of the Indonesian Bethel Church Synod must leave the names of local congregations. Thus, the local church will be called by the name of GBI accompanied by the name of the street/place where the church is located. This name change took a long time to be accepted by the local congregations within the Indonesian Bethel Church Synod, including by the GBI Bethany Congregation.

In 2002, GBI Bethany Congregation in the western part of Indonesia led by Pdt. Dr. Ir. Niko Njotorahardjo stated that he would follow the decision of the GBI Synod to lower the name of the Bethany Congregation. This decision was followed by all local churches that are members of the Bethany Congregation GBI coordination in the western part of Indonesia which is under the guidance of Pdt. Dr. Ir. Niko Njotorahardjo. Likewise all local churches that are members of the GBI Bethany Congregation in eastern Indonesia led by Pdt. Dr. Ir. Timotius Arifin Tedjasukmana decided to drop the name. By changing the name of the Bethany Congregation GBI in the two regions, this was followed at the same time by abandoning the vision of "Successful Bethany Families".

However, it is slightly different from the Bethany Congregation GBI in the central part of Indonesia, because it turns out that Pdt. Dr. Abraham Alex Tanuseputra was only willing to lower the name of GBI Bethany Congregation, but he refused to lower the church's vision of "Successful Bethany Families" which has been carried out for years. This vision is still supported by all local churches that are members of the Bethany Congregation GBI coordination in the central part of Indonesia.

=== Issued from the Indonesia Bethel Church Synod ===
On December 11, 2002, Rev. Ir. Leonard Limato, M.A. established the Indonesian Bethany Church Synod, with deed Number 2 at Notary WINARKO, SH and has been registered on:

1. Regional Office of East Java Province Ministry of Religion of the Republic of Indonesia, dated 15 January 2003, No: Wm.07.02/BA.01.1/103/2003.

2. Director General of Christian Community Guidance Ministry of Religion of the Republic of Indonesia, dated 17 January 2003, No: DJ.III/Kep/HK.00.5/5/158/2003.

so that on January 17, 2003, the Indonesian Bethany Church Synod was officially established as a church legal entity.

The newly established Synod was chaired by Rev. Ir. Leonard Limato, M.A.

Thus all the local churches that were originally part of the coordination of the GBI Bethany Congregation throughout Indonesia have officially split to continue joining the Indonesian Bethel Church Synod or choosing to leave and join the Bethany Indonesia Synod.

Local churches that are members of the GBI Bethany Congregation in Indonesia joined the Bethany Indonesia Church Synod. While the Synod of the Bethany Indonesia Church has been officially established, Pdt. Prof. Dr. Abraham Alex Tanuseputra explicitly stated that he was not part of the Indonesian Bethel Church Synod and chose to remain at the Indonesian Bethel Church Synod.

Finally, after reconciliation efforts between Pdt. Prof. Dr. Abraham Alex Tanuseputra with the Indonesian Bethel Church Synod did not bring results, Pdt. Prof. Dr. Abraham Alex Tanuseputra was finally dismissed (expelled) from the Indonesian Bethel Church Synod through a letter of dismissal by the Complete Working Committee of the Indonesian Bethel Synod Church and indicated that Pdt. Prof. Dr. Abraham Alex Tanuseputra was in two synods (the Indonesian Bethany Church Synod and the Indonesian Bethel Church Synod).

In July 2003, the Founding Body of the Indonesian Bethany Church Synod officially asked Rev. Prof. Dr. Abraham Alex Tanuseputra to join the Bethany Indonesia Church Synod.

On September 16 to 18, 2003, the General Assembly of the Synod I of the Bethany Indonesia Church was held at Graha Bethany Nginden - Surabaya, and resulted in a decision to choose Rev. Prof. Dr. Abraham Alex Tanuseputra as Chairman of the Synod and Rev. Freddy Zacharia Riva as General Secretary of the Synod - for the term of office from 18 September 2003 to 18 September 2007.

=== Leader reconciliation ===
The reconciliation of Bethany Church leaders took place on 17-19 August 2010 together with SPGI 2010 at Graha Bethany Nginden - Surabaya. There was reconciliation between the leaders and predecessors of the Bethany Church, namely: Pdt. Prof. Dr. Abraham Alex Tanuseputra, Rev. Dr. Ir. Niko Njotorahardjo, Pdt. Dr. Ir. Timotius Arifin Tedjasukmana, and Rev. Dr. Yusak Hadisiswantoro, M.A. Since this moment of leader reconciliation, there has been a renewed unity of heart between the leaders of the Bethany Church.

=== Next generation ===
After the tenure of Pdt. Prof. Dr. Abraham Alex Tanuseputra as General Chairperson of the Synod Workers' Assembly ended on September 18 2007, it turned out that a General Assembly was never held, but the Amendment Deed was made, October 24 2007, No. 2 at Notary MUFIDAH IRMA SAFITRI, SH - the main change from the previous articles of association was to appoint Pdt. Prof. Dr. Abraham Alex Tanuseputra as Chairman of the Apostolic Council and Mr. Bethany with veto rights.

Deed of Amendment, dated 24 October 2007, No. 2 at Notary Mufidah Irma Safitri, SH, never received approval from the Ministry of Religion of the Republic of Indonesia because it contradicted the previous statutes, which required that every amendment must go through a grand assembly.

Based on the Deed of Amendment, dated 24 October 2007, No. 2 at Notary Mufidah Irma Safitri, SH - then Pdt. Prof. Dr. Abraham Alex Tanuseputra as Chairman of the Synod Apostolic Council:

1. on January 23, 2008 issued letter No. 001/SKEP/DRS/GB/I/2008 and adopted his biological son, namely: Pdt. DAVID ASWIN TANUSEPUTRA as General Chairperson of the Bethany Indonesia Church Synod Workers' Council – 2008 – 2012 service period.

2. on May 10, 2012, issued letter No. 10/SKEP/DRS/GB/V/2012 and adopted his biological children, namely: Pdt. DAVID ASWIN TANUSEPUTRA as General Chairperson of the Bethany Indonesia Church Synod Workers' Council - 2012 - 2016 service period.

In 2012, Rev. David Aswin Tanuseputra (first son, second child of the couple: Rev. Prof. Dr. Abraham Alex Tanuseputra with Mrs. Yenny Oentario), was ordained by the Chairman of the Apostolic Council of the Bethany Indonesia Church Synod to become the Pastor of the Bethany Indonesia Church in the city of Surabaya and also concurrently as Chair of the Church Synod Bethany Indonesia to continue the ministry of Pdt. Alex. While Rev. Alex currently occupies the position of Senior Pastor as well as Founding Pastor of Bethany.

In 2012, there are 300 churches and 300,000 faithful in Indonesia and 40 churches overseas.

== Beliefs ==
Gereja Bethany Indonesia recognizes, accepts, and establishes the Apostles' Creed as the Gereja Bethany Indonesia Confession of Faith and has a charismatic faith.

== See also ==
- List of the largest evangelical churches
- List of the largest evangelical church auditoriums
