= List of the largest evangelical churches =

Largest evangelical Churches

This list of the largest evangelical megachurches contains evangelical Christian megachurches by weekly attendance. Large churches from other denominations, like Catholicism, are not included as they are not deemed to belong to the megachurch phenomenon which by definition is part of Protestantism. The list is not exhaustive, there are large annual changes, and there are difficulties to compare the churches as different methods to count can be used.

== Characteristics ==
The term megachurch is used for churches with regular attendance of 2,000 people. When it has more than 10,000 people who gather together, the term gigachurch is sometimes used.

== Statistics ==
Exponential counts 270 evangelical megachurches worldwide (excluding Canada and the United States). The Hartford Institute counts over 1,800 megachurches in the United States and 35 in Canada.

Outreach Magazine is a magazine which publishes annually a list of evangelical Christian megachurches in USA.

== Data accuracy ==
The numbers reported are not accurate by any means, as attendance and membership may be defined very differently. Attendance may include people that are not legally members of the church, not baptised, non-believers, children, and may even belong to other churches. Some churches include their, sometimes loosely, affiliated churches in other places and even people that attend by electronic media. As many have several services on one day, there may be some overlap, with people attending more than one service. The exact number of people is seldom counted, thus estimation errors can occur. There is an obvious psychological boost from reporting growing numbers, "success", for enhanced credibility and motivation to support the work. The megachurches may quite be different from traditional evangelical congregations where clear membership records are maintained, to define who has legal right to vote in the church assembly, who can be appointed to public offices and who belongs to the flock under direct pastoral care, and the pastor can often be replaced. The megachurches are often formed around a strong leader that stays in charge for decades, it is often like his "own personal enterprise", many times with limited economic transparency, a tendency that has been questioned in various countries. In notable cases the headship has been passed on from father to son, like in Lakewood Church. Many megachurches have had an affiliation to a denomination, but have become independent, thus outside the denominational supervision that is common for non-independent congregations. Thus, in cases of irregularities, a pastor may continue without disciplinary measures, due to their sheer power, and any disappointed members may leave but new people keep coming in, with reduced effect on attendance.

Hence, due to inaccuracies, the same church can sometimes be reported to have attendance and membership counts that differ 5–10 times, depending on how reporting is done and who is doing it, e.g. Yoido Full Gospel Church can sometimes be mentioned with attendance numbers over 800,000.

== List ==
The list below is of the largest Evangelical megachurches with weekly attendance of more than 30,000 people.

Name	Association	Denomination	City	Country	Average weekly attendance
Deeper Life Bible Church	No	Pentecostalism	Lagos	Nigeria	555,000
Yoido Full Gospel Church	Assemblies of God	Pentecostalism	Seoul	South Korea	480,000
Jesus Is Lord Church	No	Nondenominational Christianity	Bulacan	Philippines	333,506
Calvary Temple	No	Nondenominational Christianity	Hyderabad	India	330,000
Victory Christian Fellowship	Every Nation Churches, Philippine Council of Evangelical Churches	Nondenominational Christianity	Manila	Philippines	295,000
Christ's Commission Fellowship	Philippine Council of Evangelical Churches	Nondenominational Christianity	Pasig	Philippines	243,000
Nginden Bethany Church	Bethany Indonesian Church	Charismatic Christianity	Surabaya	Indonesia	140,000
Dunamis International Gospel Centre	No	Pentecostalism	Abuja	Nigeria	100,000
Life.Church	Evangelical Covenant Church	Nondenominational Christianity	Edmond	United States	76,000
New Life Fellowship Association	New Life Fellowship Association	Nondenominational Christianity	Mumbai	India	70,000
Church of the Highlands	No	Nondenominational Christianity	Birmingham	United States	60,000
Faith Tabernacle	Living Faith Church Worldwide	Charismatic Christianity	Lagos	Nigeria	50,000
Igreja Batista da Lagoinha	Convenção Batista Nacional (Baptist World Alliance)	Baptist	Belo Horizonte	Brazil	50,000
Mision Cristiana Elim Internacional	No	Pentecostalism	San Salvador	El Salvador	50,000
Redeemed Christian Church of God	No	Pentecostalism	Lagos	Nigeria	50,000
Lakewood Church	No	Nondenominational Christianity	Houston	United States	45,000
North Point Community Church	No	Nondenominational Christianity	Alpharetta	United States	43,830
Comunidad Cristiana Agua Viva	No	Charismatic Christianity	Lima	Peru	42,000
New Life Assembly of God	General Council of the Assemblies of God of India (Assemblies of God)	Pentecostalism	Chennai	India	40,000
Word of Hope Christian Family Church	Assemblies of God, Philippine Council of Evangelical Churches	Pentecostalism	Manila	Philippines	32,500

== See also ==
- List of the largest evangelical church auditoriums
- List of megachurches in the United States
