= Mixco =

- Municipality
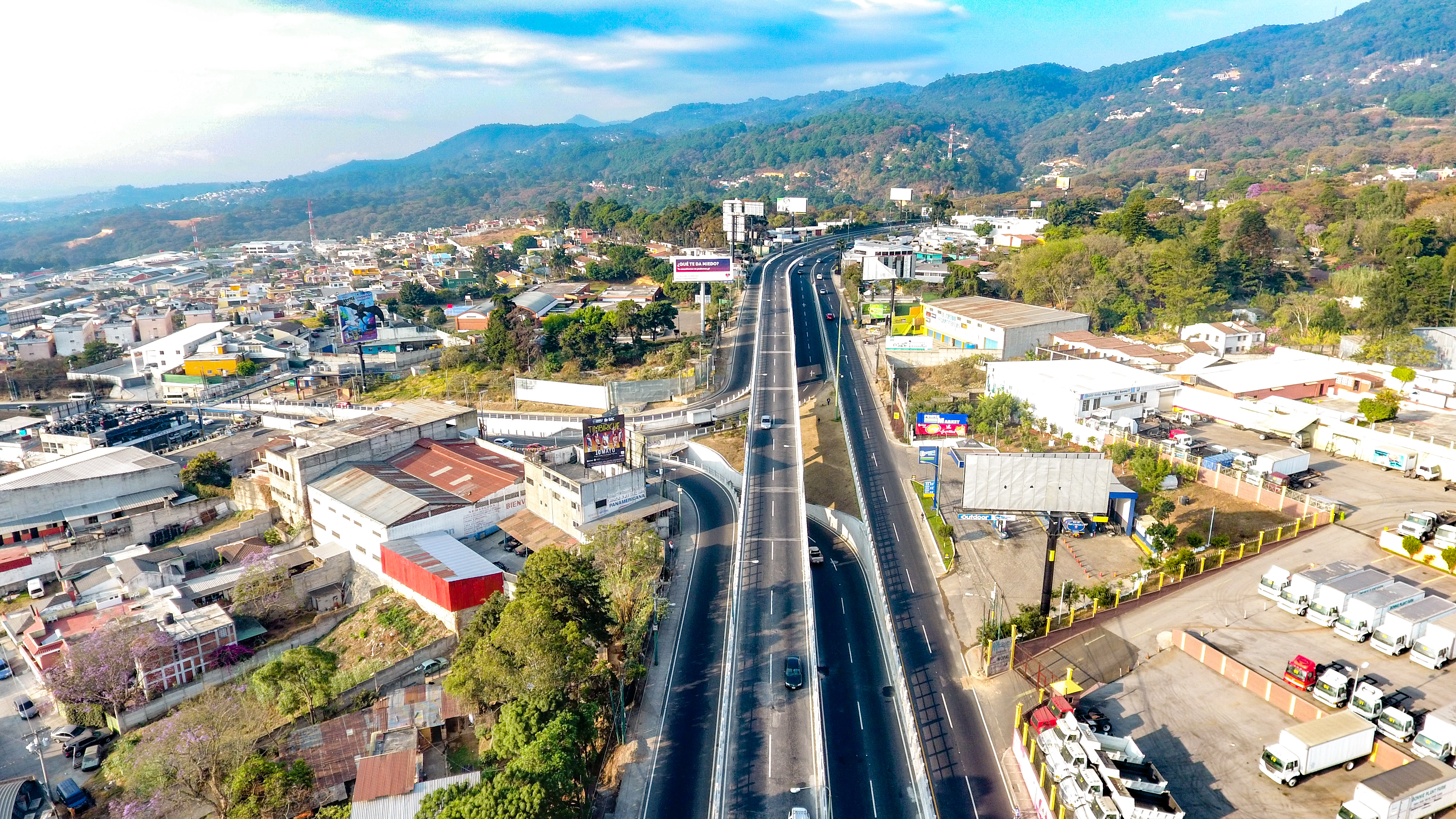
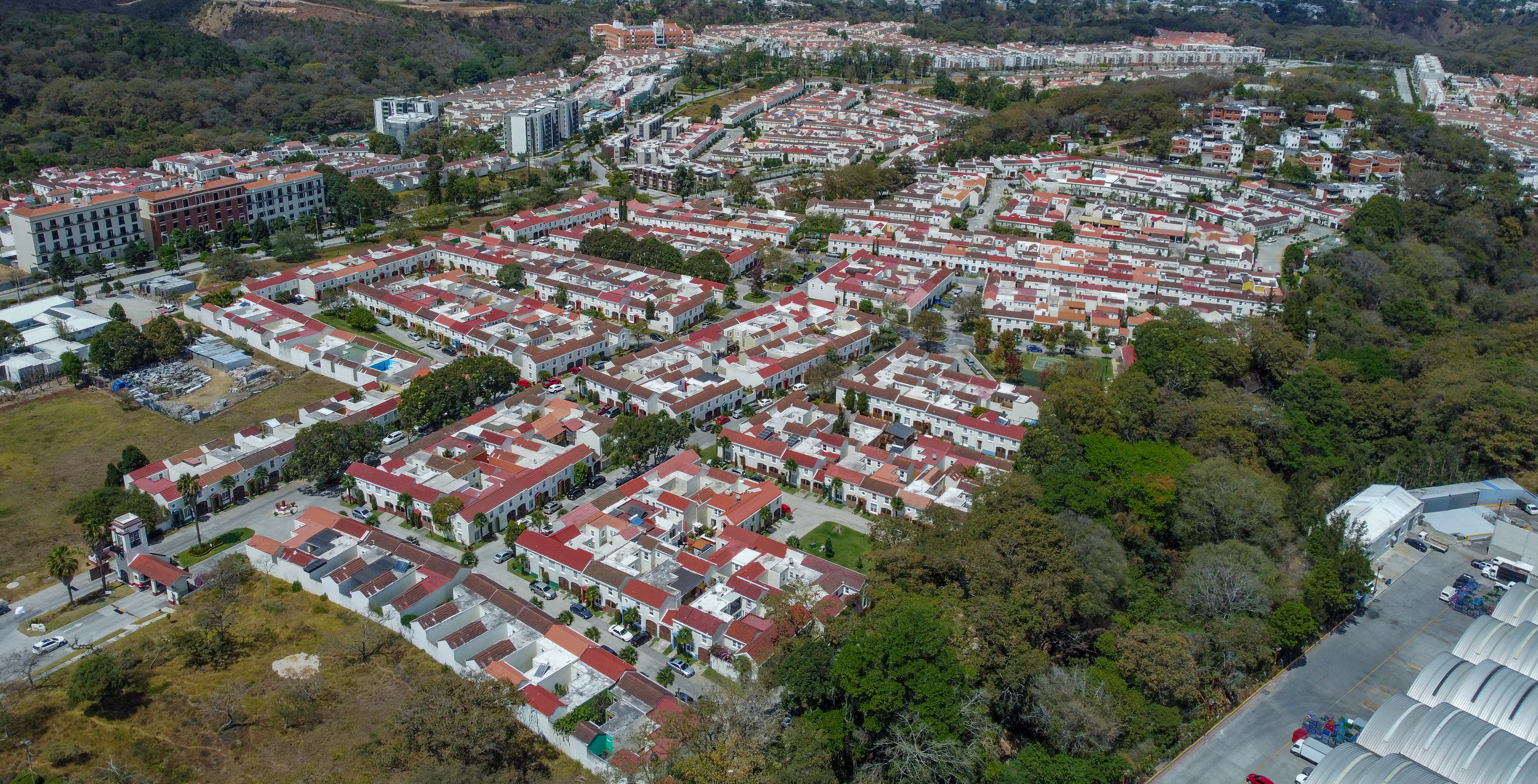
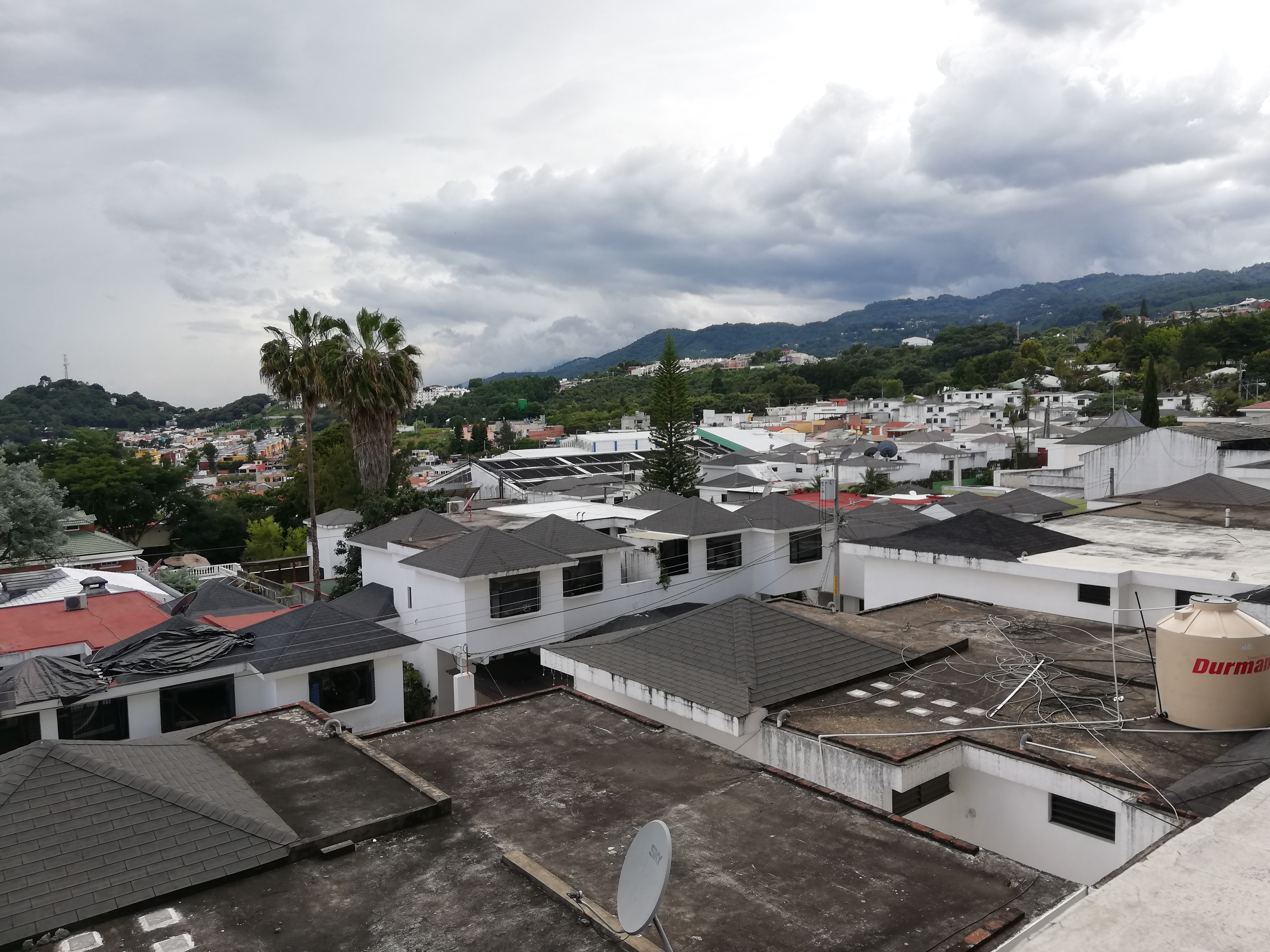
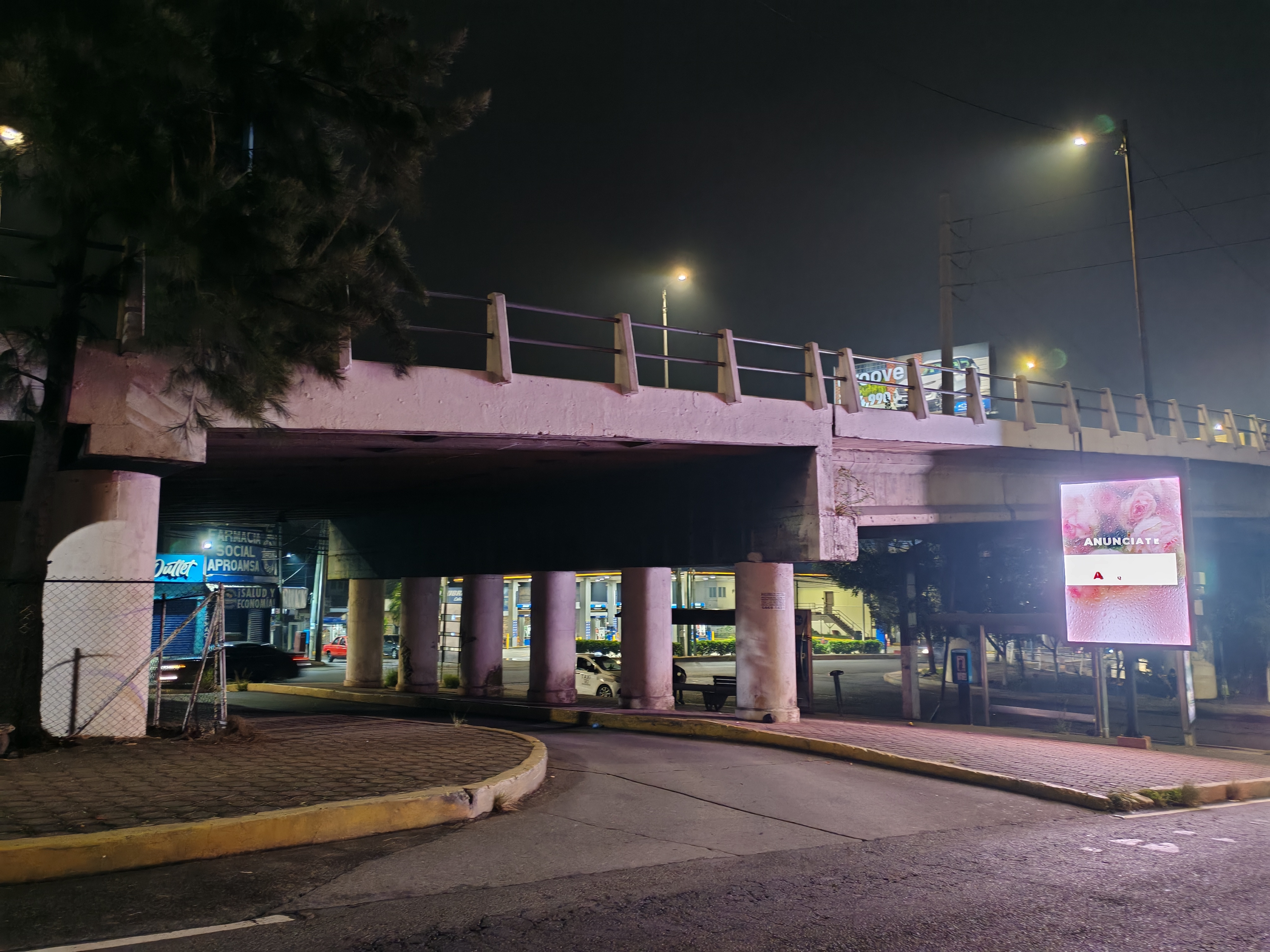
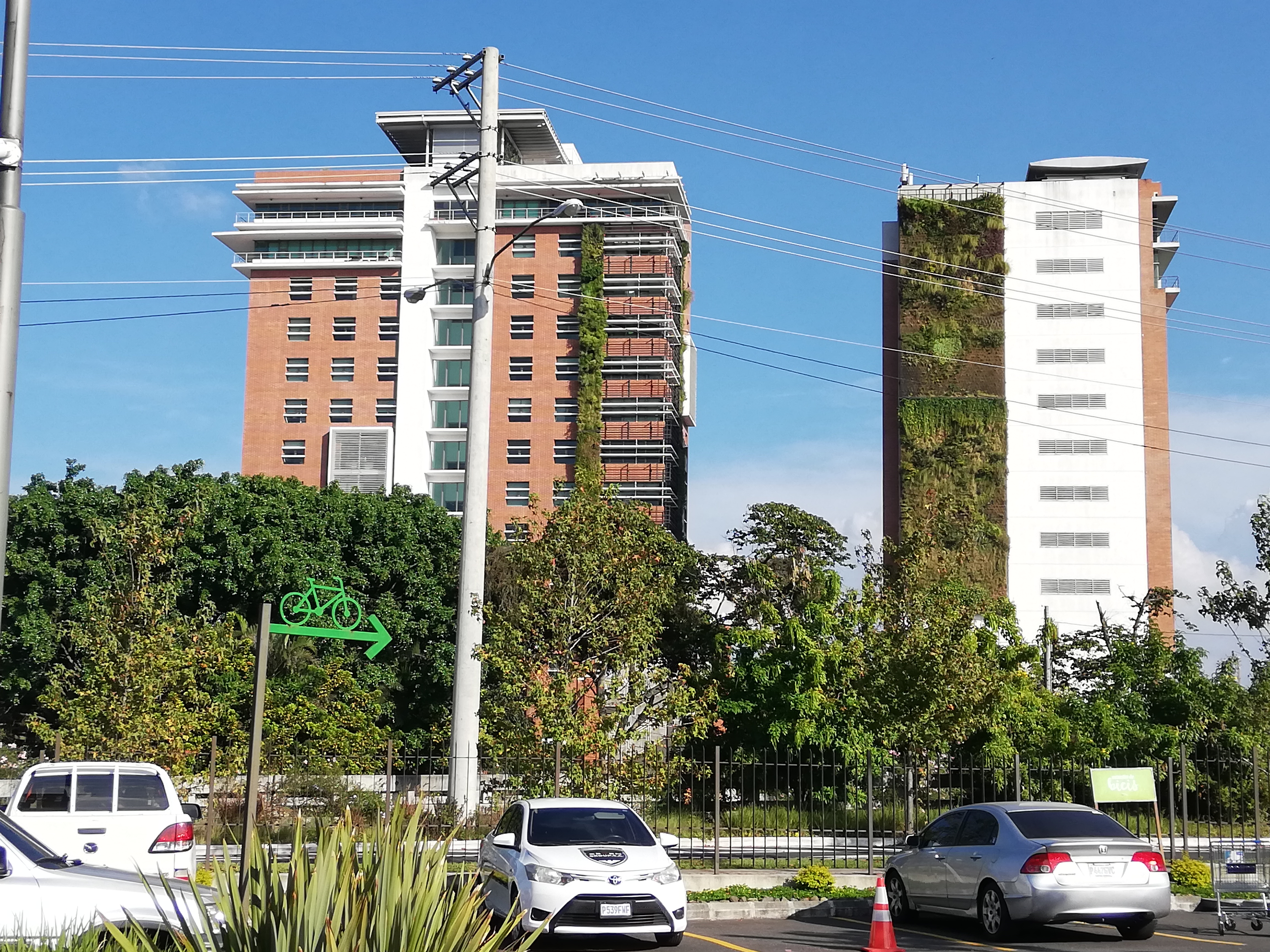
- From top, left to right: View of the city • The El Naranjo Condominium • View of Ciudad San Cristóbal • The San Cristóbal Bridge at night • Buildings in El Naranjo

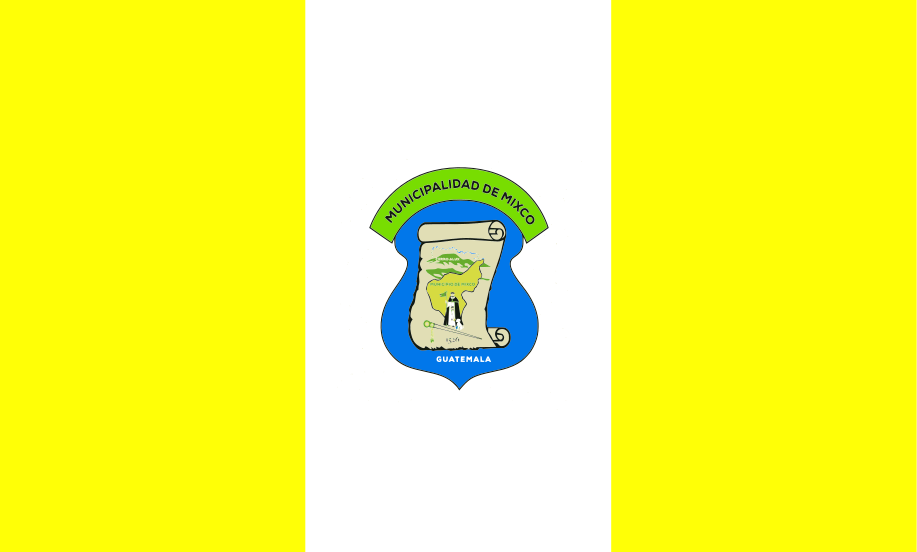
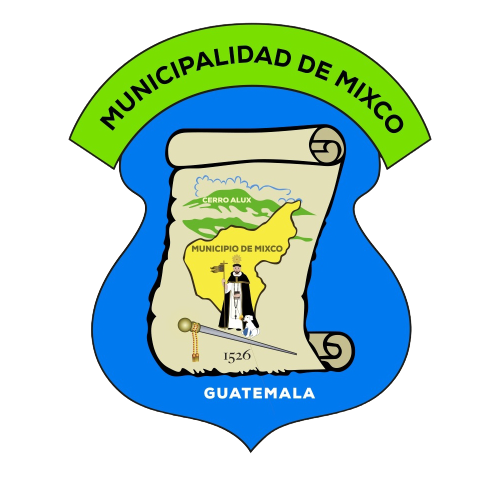
- Flag Coat of arms
- Motto: Land of champions Spanish: Tierra de campeones
- Location in Guatemala Mixco (Guatemala)
- Coordinates: 14°37′59″N 90°36′23″W
- Country: Guatemala
- Department: Guatemala

Government
  - Mayor: Neto Bran (RM)

Area
  - Total: 95.9 km^{2} (37.0 sq mi)
- Elevation: 1,691 m (5,548 ft)

Population (census 2018)
  - Total: 465,773
  - Rank: 2nd in Guatemala
  - Density: 4,860/km^{2} (12,600/sq mi)
- Climate: Cwb

Mixco (Spanish pronunciation: [ˈmisko]) is a city and municipality in the Guatemala department of Guatemala. It is next to the main Guatemala City municipality and has become part of the Guatemala City Metropolitan Area. Most of Mixco is separated from the City by canyons, for which a multitude of bridges have been created. It is the second largest city in Guatemala after Guatemala City, with a population of 465,773. Ciudad San Cristóbal is located within Mixco.

== Administrative division ==
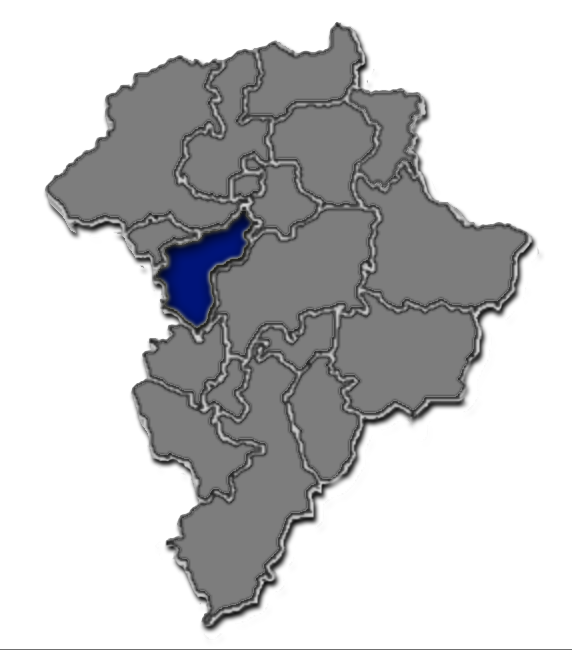
Guatemala Department map, showing Mixco municipality area.

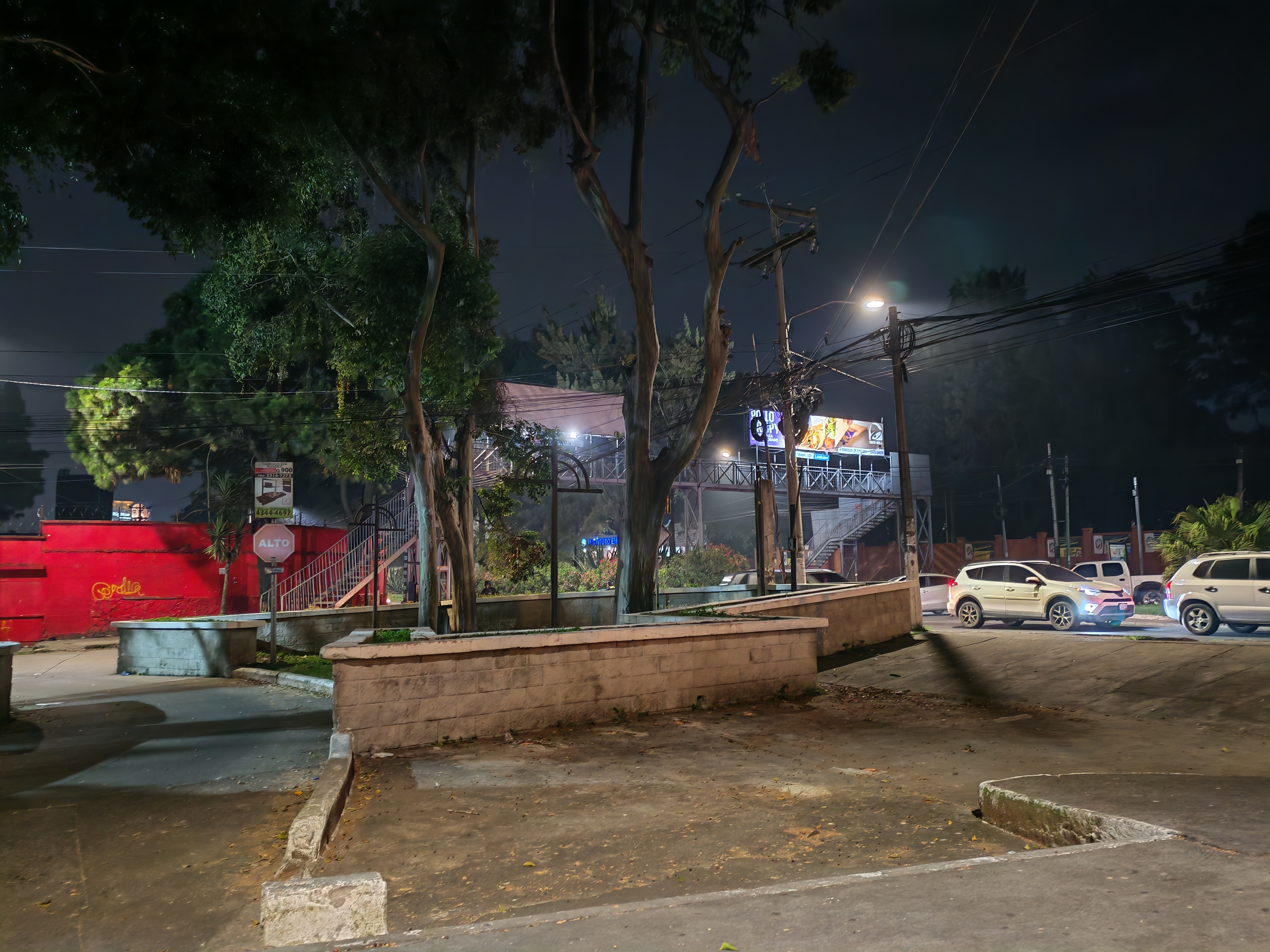
Bosques San Nicolás Park seen at night.

The municipality is divided into zones with residential neighborhoods, villages, settlements and the municipal capital. Due to its close proximity to Guatemala City, several villages were turned into residential neighborhoods.

Mixco Administrative Division
Settlement	List
Villages	1. El Campanero; 2. El Naranjito; 3. San José La Comunidad; 4. Sacoj; 5. Lo de Coy; 6. Buena Vista; 7. Lo de Bran; 8. El Aguacate; 9. Lo de Fuentes; 10. El Manzanillo
Residential neighborhoods	1. El Milagro; 2. Monte Real; 3. Primero de Julio; 4. Monte Verde; 5. San Francisco; 6. El Castaño; 7. El Caminero; 8. Pablo VI; 9. Carolingia; 10. Belencito; 11. Las Brisas; 12. Molino de Las Flores; 13. La Brigada; 14. Ciudad San Cristóbal; 15. Belén; 16. Lomas de Portugal; 17. Monserrat; 18. Bosques de San Nicolás; 19. Las Minervas; 20. El Tesoro; 21. El Tesoro Banvi; 22. Ciudad Satelite; 23. Santa Marta

From the residential neighborhoods is excluded "La Florida", which separated from Mixco to join Guatemala City in 1958.

== Mayors ==
Elected mayors since 1986
Mayor	Time in office	Party
Juan Guillermo Gómez Valdéz	15 January 1986 - 15 January 1991	Democracia Cristiana
Víctor Manuel Herrera	15 January 1991 - 15 January 1996	Partido de Avanzada Nacional
Édgar Abraham Rivera	15 January 1996 - 15 January 2000	Partido de Avanzada Nacional
Édgar Abraham Rivera	15 January 2000 - 15 January 2004	Frente Republicano Guatemalteco
Amílcar Rivera	15 January 2004 - 15 January 2008	Partido de Avanzada Nacional
Amílcar Rivera	15 January 2008 - 15 January 2012	Partido Patriota
Otto Pérez	15 January 2012 - 15 January 2016	Partido Patriota
Neto Bran	15 January 2016 - 15 January 2020	Movimiento Reformador

== Universities ==
- UruralG
- UPANA
- USAC
- URL

== Sports ==
Deportivo Mixco football club play in the Guatemalan second division. They have been playing their home games at different locations and plan to build the new Estadio de La Tierra de Campeones.

== In film ==
- In 1969, the Mexican-Guatemalan film El ogro, with famous Mexican comedian Germán Valdéz and Guatemalan actor Herbert Meneses was filmed on location in Tikal and Mixco. The scenes shot in Mixco include Germán Valdéz as an old church keeper and a group of children who listen to his old stories.

== Climate ==
Mixco has a subtropical highland climate (Köppen: Cwb).

Climate data for Mixco
Month	Jan	Feb	Mar	Apr	May	Jun	Jul	Aug	Sep	Oct	Nov	Dec	Year
Mean daily maximum °C (°F)	22.3 (72.1)	23.4 (74.1)	24.8 (76.6)	25.3 (77.5)	24.9 (76.8)	23.4 (74.1)	23.4 (74.1)	23.7 (74.7)	23.0 (73.4)	22.4 (72.3)	22.3 (72.1)	22.2 (72.0)	23.4 (74.1)
Daily mean °C (°F)	16.4 (61.5)	17.1 (62.8)	18.2 (64.8)	19.1 (66.4)	19.3 (66.7)	18.9 (66.0)	18.7 (65.7)	18.7 (65.7)	18.4 (65.1)	17.9 (64.2)	17.2 (63.0)	16.5 (61.7)	18.0 (64.5)
Mean daily minimum °C (°F)	10.6 (51.1)	10.9 (51.6)	11.7 (53.1)	13.0 (55.4)	13.8 (56.8)	14.5 (58.1)	14.1 (57.4)	13.8 (56.8)	13.9 (57.0)	13.5 (56.3)	12.2 (54.0)	10.9 (51.6)	12.7 (54.9)
Average precipitation mm (inches)	2 (0.1)	1 (0.0)	2 (0.1)	31 (1.2)	124 (4.9)	239 (9.4)	202 (8.0)	194 (7.6)	226 (8.9)	128 (5.0)	22 (0.9)	7 (0.3)	1,178 (46.4)
Source: Climate-Data.org; Instituto Nacional de Sismología, Vulcanología, Meteorología e Hidrología de Guatemala

== See also ==
- List of places in Guatemala
- Guatemala Department
- Guatemala City
