= Dunamis International Gospel Centre =

Pentecostal church in Abuja

- Dunamis or DIGC
- Dunamis International Gospel Centre
- 8°57′55″N 7°20′36″E
- Location: Abuja, Nigeria
- Address: Airport Road, Lugbe 900107, Federal Capital Territory, Nigeria
- Language: English language
- Denomination: Pentecostal
- Website: dunamisgospel.org

History
- Founded: November 10, 1996; 29 years ago
- Founder: Paul Enenche
- Events: Commanding the Day Mid-Night Prayer (11pm WAT); Mid-Week Service (Wednesdays); Healing and Deliverance Service (Tuesdays); Worship, Word and Wonders Night (the last Friday each month)

Specifications
- Capacity: 100,000

Dunamis International Gospel Centre (DIGC), is a church headquartered in Abuja, Nigeria, with Dr. Paul and Dr. Becky Enenche, as the senior pastors.

== History ==
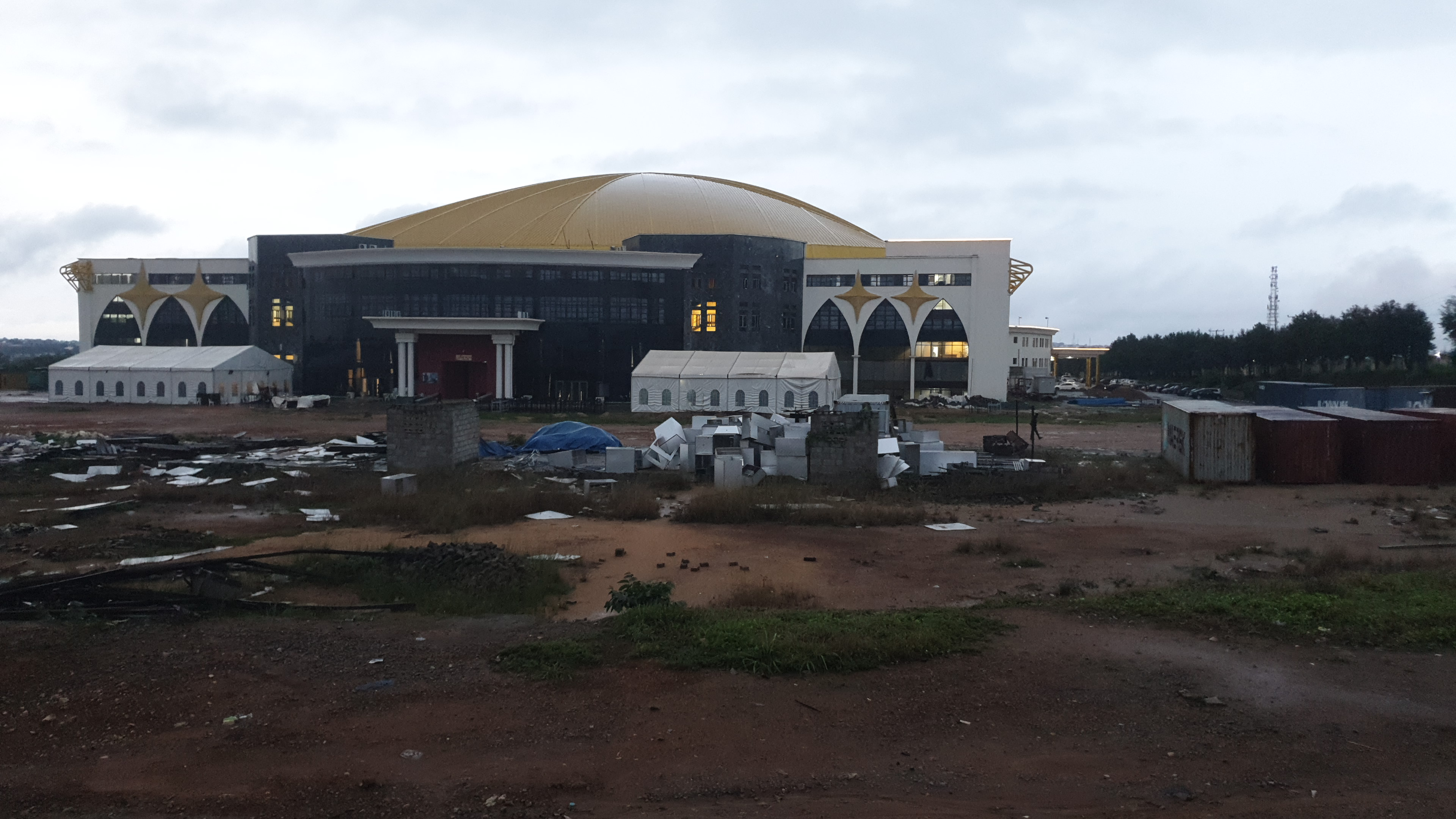
Side view of The Glory Dome

Dunamis International Gospel Centre was established on November 10, 1996. A church service was held there for two weeks before the church moved to the Abuja Sheraton Hotel & Towers, where worship took place for about six months. The church moved to its own worship location at Area 1, beside the Old Federal Secretariat in Abuja, in June 1997, less than a year after the ministry started. The ministry has several branches worldwide.

== Locations ==
=== Glory Dome ===
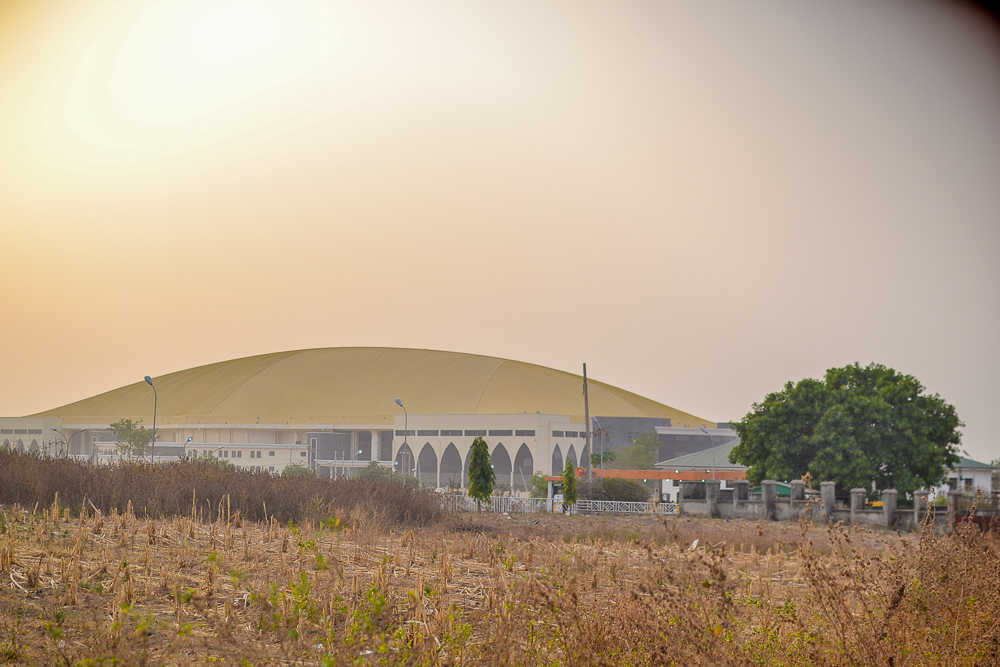
The Glory Dome

On November 24, 2018, the new international church headquarters, known as the Glory Dome (or glory sanctuary), was dedicated. It has a 100,000 capacity auditorium.

The Glory Dome sits on an expanse of land referred to as the Lord's Garden, situated on the airport road in Abuja, Nigeria. Its foundation was laid on September 14, 2014, and construction took four years from 2014 to 2018 with its roof built by Geometrica Incorporated.

=== Church collapse ===
On 3 October 2023, Dunamis International Gospel Centre, North Bank branch in Makurdi, Benue State, Nigeria collapsed, killing pastor Emmanuel Ahmed and leaving four others injured. The senior pastor of the commission Paul Enenche visited the scene. The state governor Hyacinth Alia also visited the church.
