= Megachurch =

Large Christian congregation; generally Protestant

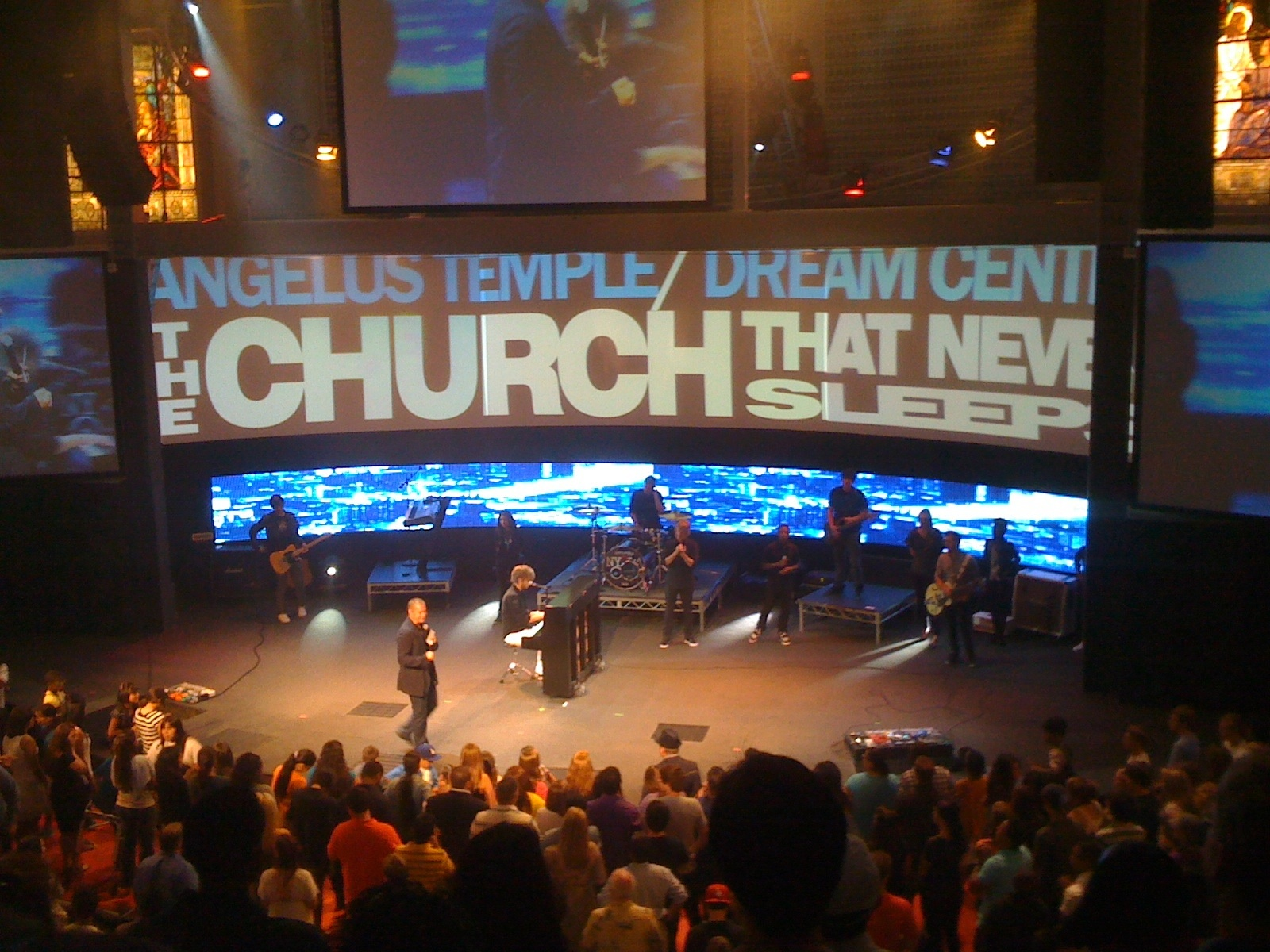
Worship service at Angelus Temple in 2010, then part of the Dream Center and now the Foursquare Church

A megachurch is a congregation with a very large building and membership. Most megachurches offer a variety of educational and social activities and are evangelical, although the term "evangelical" usually denotes a type of organization, not a denomination. Megachurches are generally defined as any (typically Protestant) Christian church that on average draws 2,000 or more people per week.

The first megachurch was established in London in 1861. More emerged in the 20th century, especially in the United States, and expanded rapidly through the 1980s and 1990s. In the 21st century, megachurches became widespread in the United States and are a global growing phenomenon.

In the late 2000s and early 2010s, they shifted away from traditional architecture, with many newer ones having stadium-type seating; some, such as Lakewood Church, are even based in former or active arenas.

== History ==
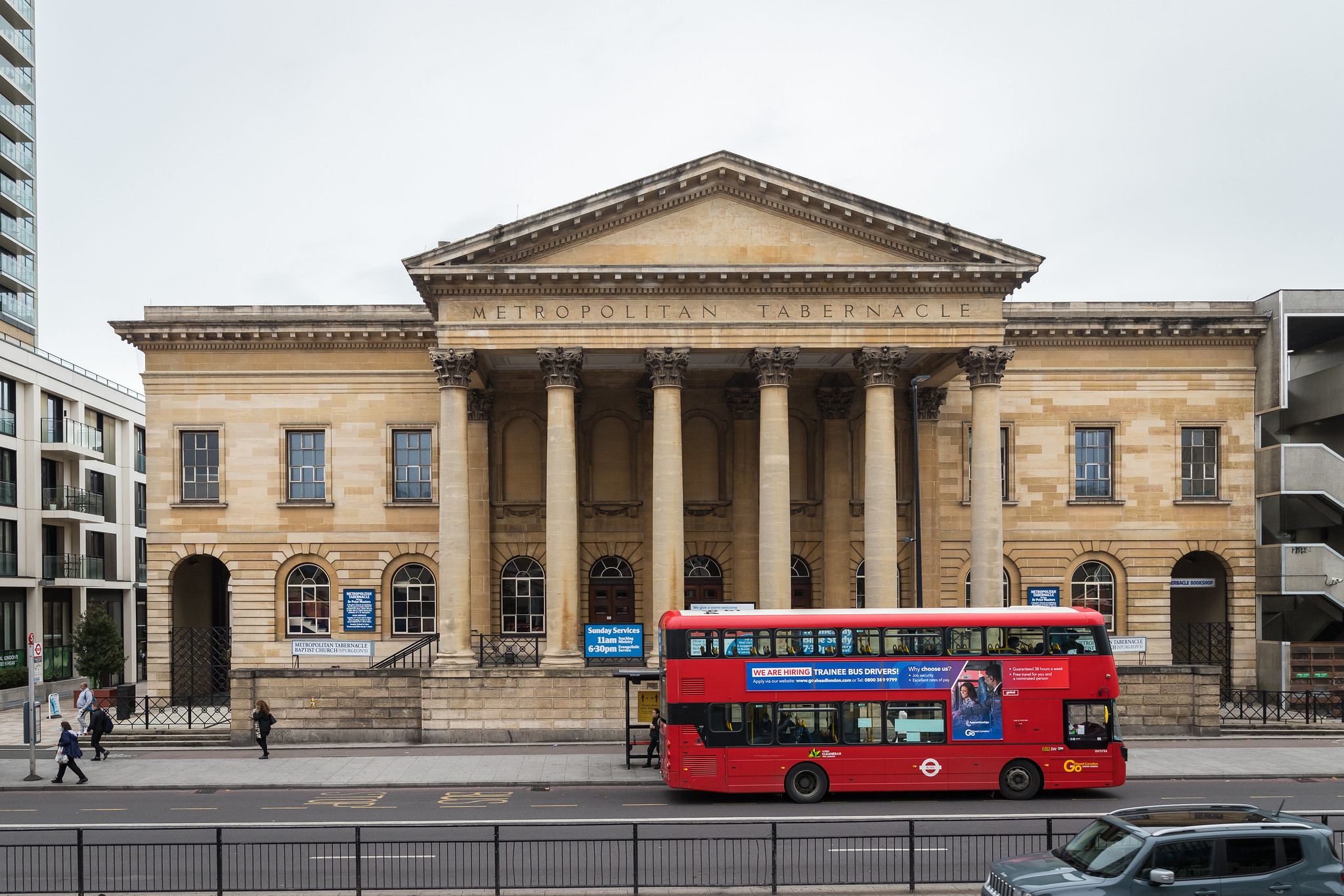
Metropolitan Tabernacle, in London, England

The origins of the megachurch movement, with many local congregants who returned on a weekly basis, can be traced to the 19th century. There were large churches earlier, but they were considerably rarer.

The first evangelical megachurch was founded in 1861 in London by Charles Spurgeon at the Metropolitan Tabernacle, which had a 6,000-seat auditorium. The first megachurch in the United States was the Angelus Temple, founded in 1923 by Aimee Semple McPherson in a 5,300-seat auditorium in Los Angeles.

However, prior to 1955, megachurches were a rare phenomenon, with only around a dozen in the world. During this time, megachurches served a different function than modern megachurches. Starting in the 1950s, and accelerating in the 1980s, megachurches began to appear more commonly, which is when they took on the shape they are known by now. Between 1955 and 1992, over 350 megachurches were founded in the United States.

== Features ==
A megachurch has been defined by the Hartford Institute for Religion Research (2006) and others as any Protestant Christian church attended by at least 2,000 people in a weekend. The Oxford English Dictionary suggests that megachurches often include educational and social activities and are usually Protestant and Evangelical. These large congregations are a significant development in Protestant Christianity.

Most of these churches build their buildings in the suburbs of large cities, near major roads and highways, to be visible to as many people as possible and easily accessible by car. Some install a large cross as decoration for believers and to signal to potential new members. One study found that megachurches in the US are more common in states with higher residential mobility--more people moving homes. The hypothesis is that megachurches are easier to join (and leave) than smaller churches, which have more tight-knit communities. And these sorts of "easy entry" churches are better suited for newcomers to a community.

A 2020 study by the Hartford Institute found that 70 percent of American megachurches had a multi-site network and an average of 7.6 services per weekend. The study also found that most U.S. megachurches are in Florida, Texas, California, and Georgia.

Churches that gather more than 10,000 people every Sunday have been dubbed gigachurches. In 2015, there were about 100 gigachurches in the United States.

Several megachurch pastors also preach on television or radio programs, thereby also being televangelists. Aimee Semple McPherson was a pioneer of radio evangelism and a founder of an early megachurch. Robert Schuller, Oral Roberts, Jerry Falwell, Joel Osteen, and T. D. Jakes developed both megachurch and television audiences.

== Statistics ==
Exponential counts 270 evangelical megachurches worldwide (excluding Canada and the United States). The Hartford Institute counts over 1,800 megachurches in the United States and 35 in Canada.

== By region ==
=== Africa ===
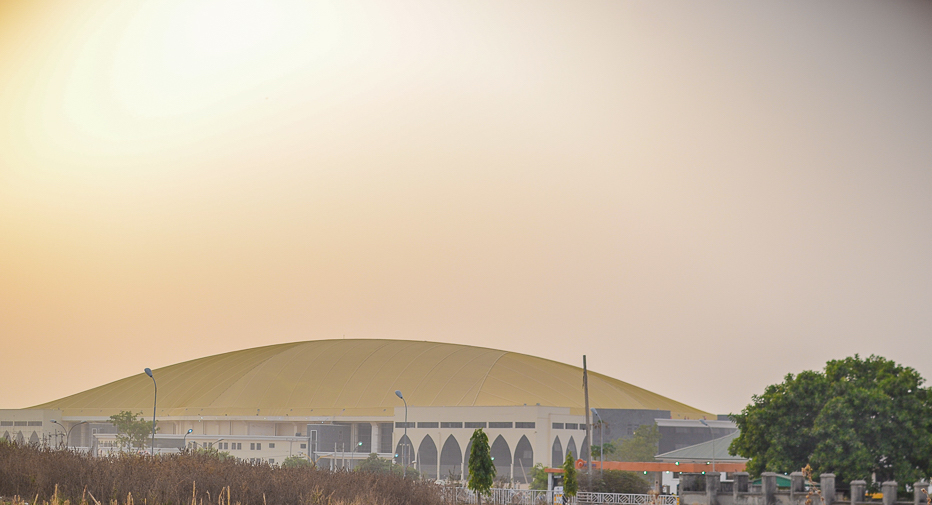
The Glory Dome, affiliated with Dunamis International Gospel Centre, with 100,000 seats, in Abuja, Nigeria

Megachurches are found in many countries of Sub-Saharan Africa, including Tanzania, Nigeria, South Africa, Ghana, Kenya, and Uganda. The largest church auditorium, The Glory Dome, was inaugurated in 2018 with 100,000 seats, in Abuja, Nigeria.

=== Americas ===
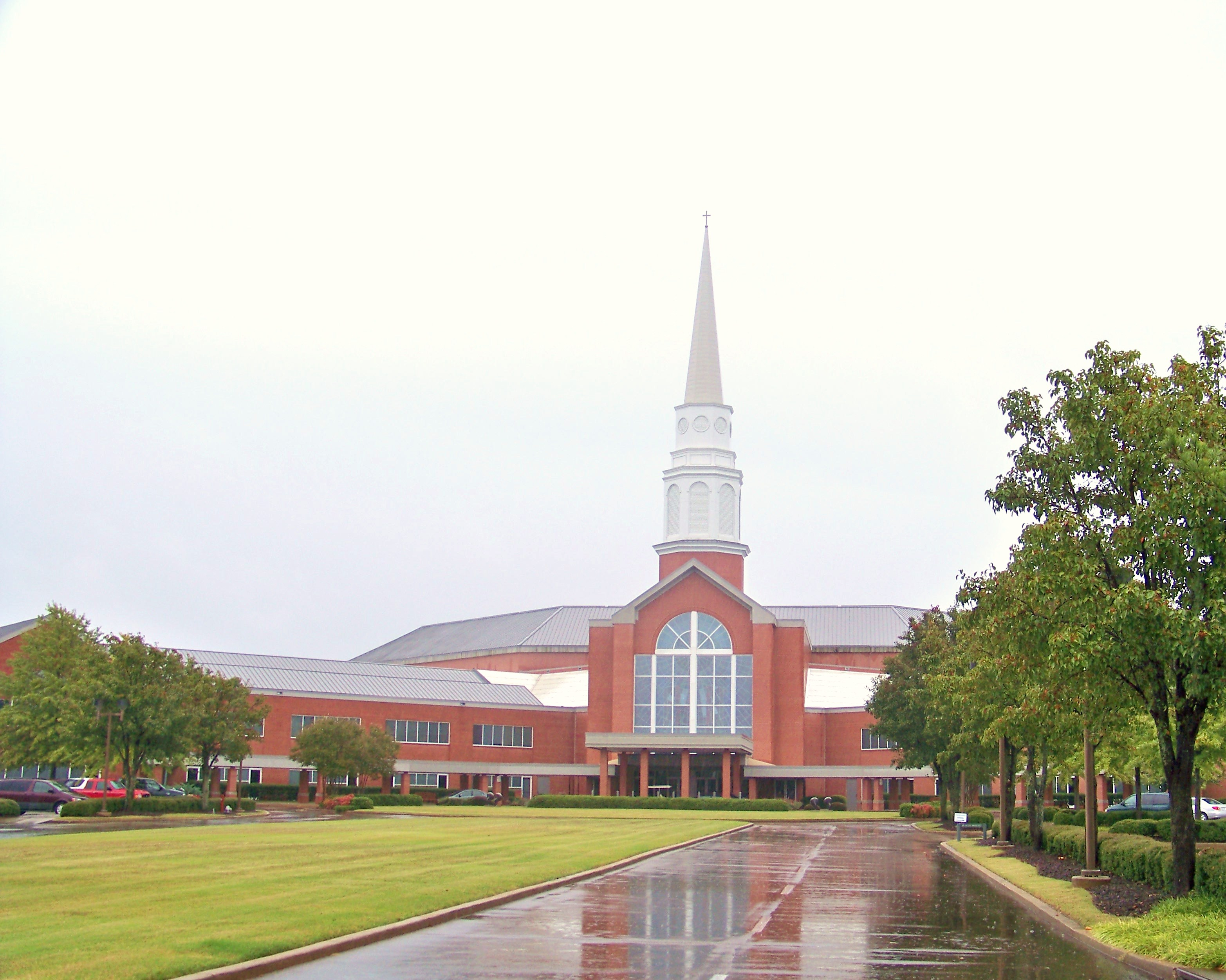
Germantown Baptist Church in Germantown, Tennessee, United States

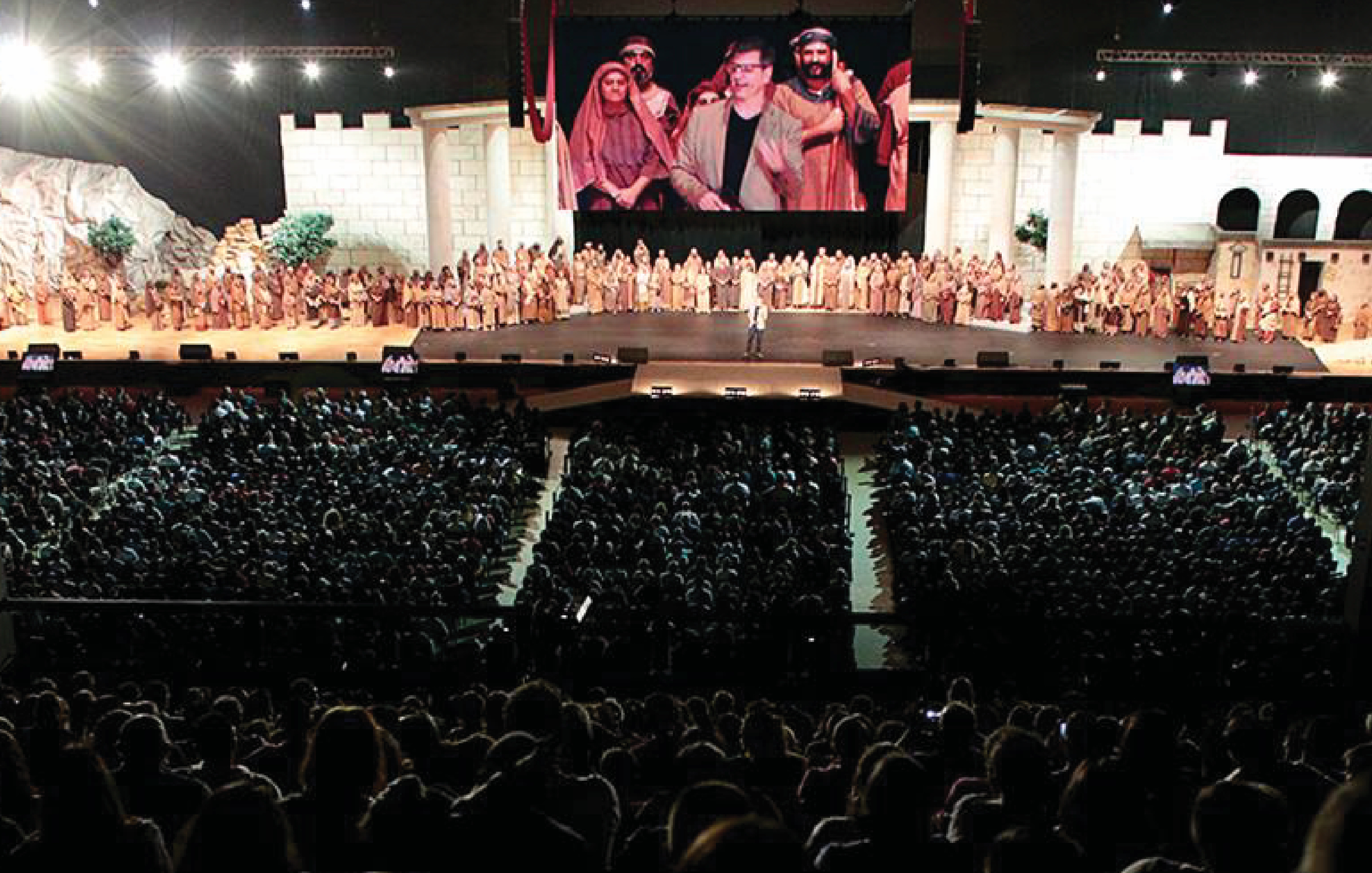
Show on the life of Jesus at City Church, affiliated with the Brazilian Baptist Convention, in São José dos Campos

In 2010, the Hartford Institute's database listed more than 1,300 megachurches in the United States. About 50 churches on the list had average attendance exceeding 10,000, and one had 47,000. On one weekend in November 2015, around one in ten Protestant churchgoers in the U.S.—about 5 million people—attended service in a megachurch. Some 3,000 individual Catholic Church parishes have 2,000 or more attendants for an average Sunday Mass, but they are not called megachurches as that is a Protestant term.

In the United States, the phenomenon has more than quadrupled in the two decades leading up to 2017.

During the 20th century, Evangelical and Pentecostal churches attracted many rural migrants living in metropolises in Latin America that converted from Catholicism. Although much of this growth has been due to individual small congregations, megachurches have grown in popularity with middle and upper class Latin Americans as well as younger people in the region. Some of the largest megachurches in the region include Misión Cristiana Elim, Primera Iglesia Metodista Pentecostal, Igreja da Paz, and Batista da Lagoinha.

=== Asia ===
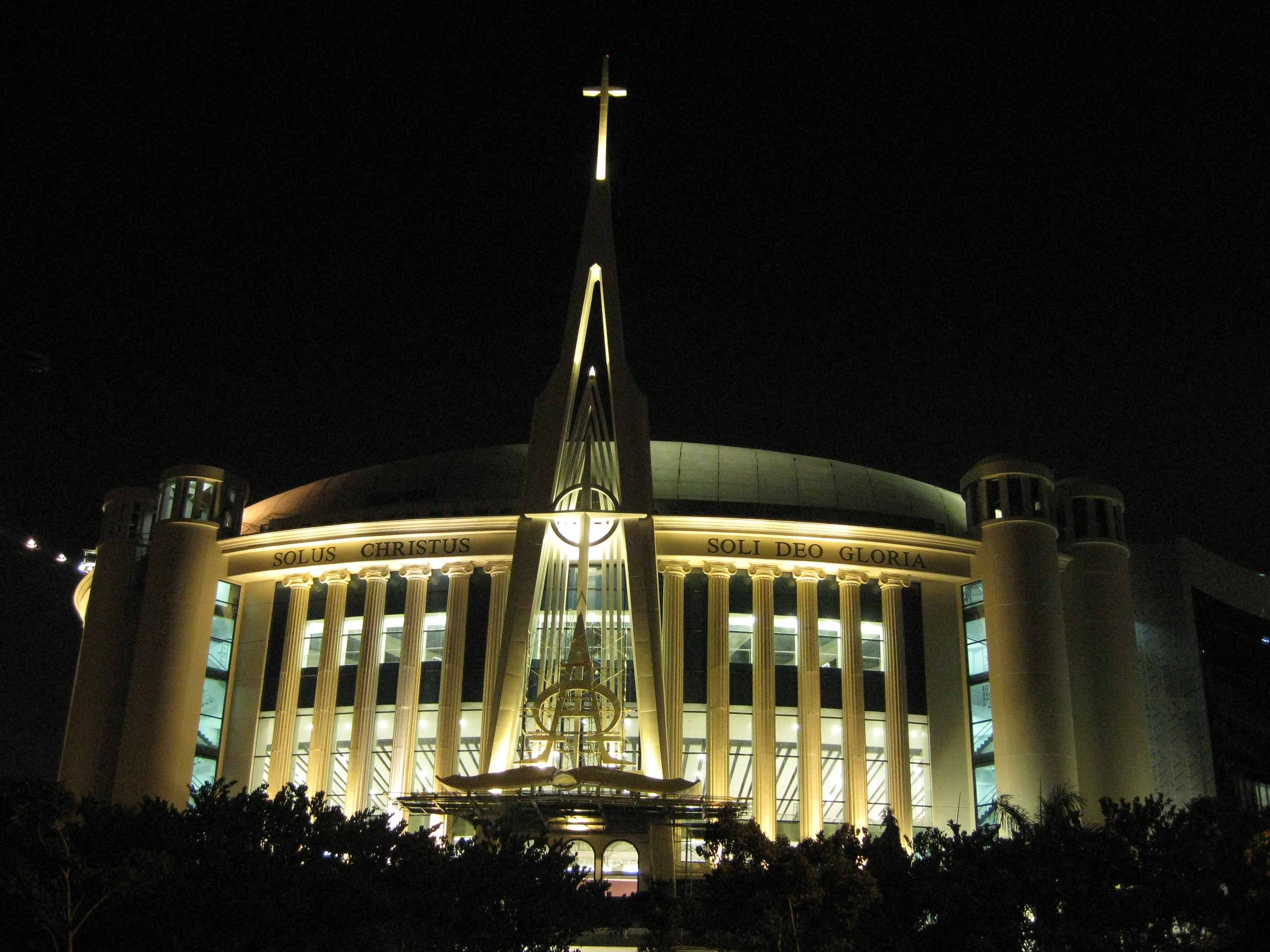
Messiah Cathedral, affiliated with the Indonesian Reformed Evangelical Church

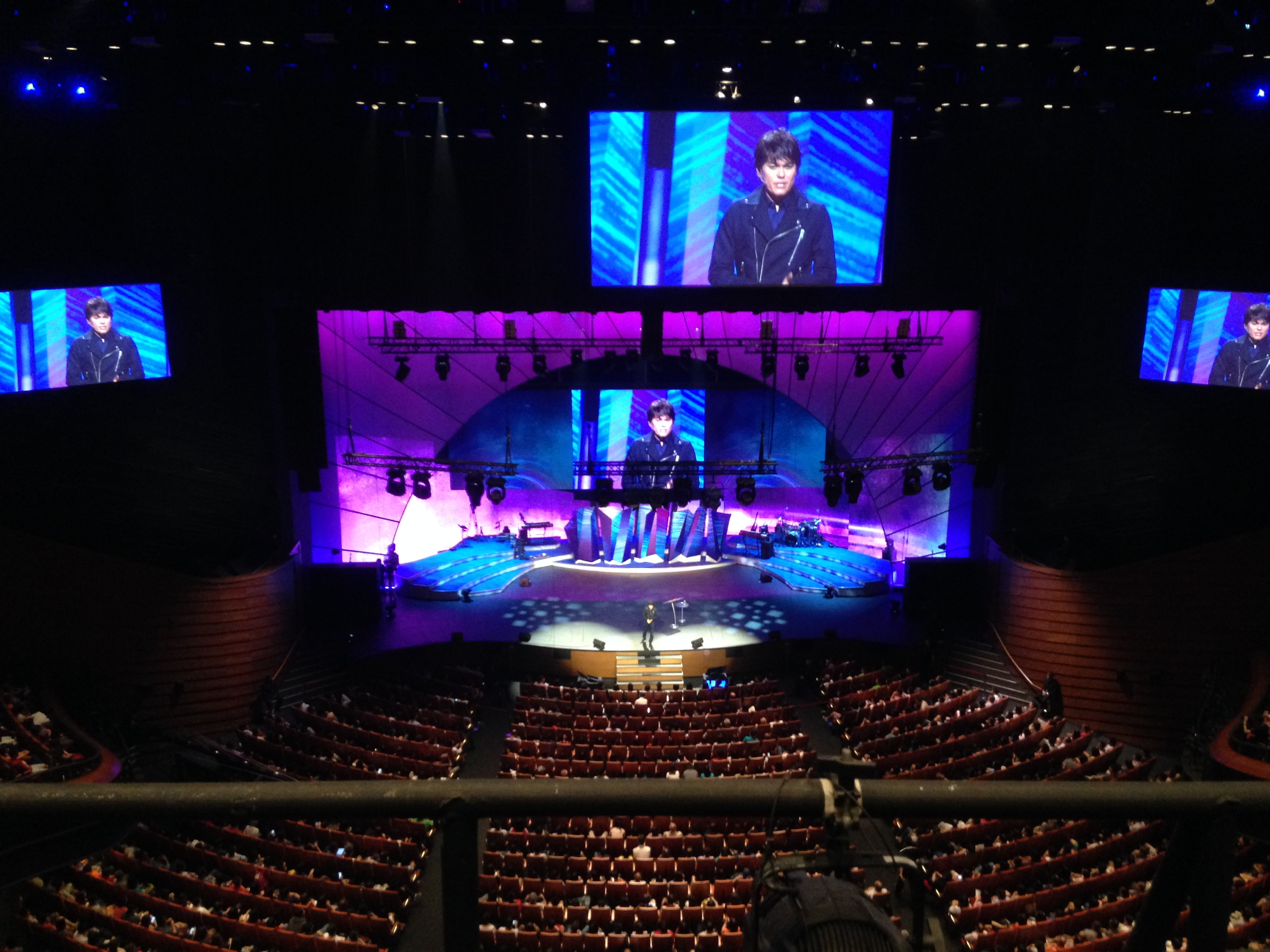
New Creation Church service in The Star Performing Arts Centre, Singapore

In 2007, five of the ten largest Protestant churches were in South Korea. In 2007, the largest megachurch in the world by attendance was South Korea's Yoido Full Gospel Church, an Assemblies of God (Pentecostal) church, with more than 830,000 members.

Graha Bethany Nginden is a megachurch which is one of the largest churches in Surabaya, Indonesia and Southeast Asia. The Church is affiliated with Bethany Indonesian Church.

=== Australia ===
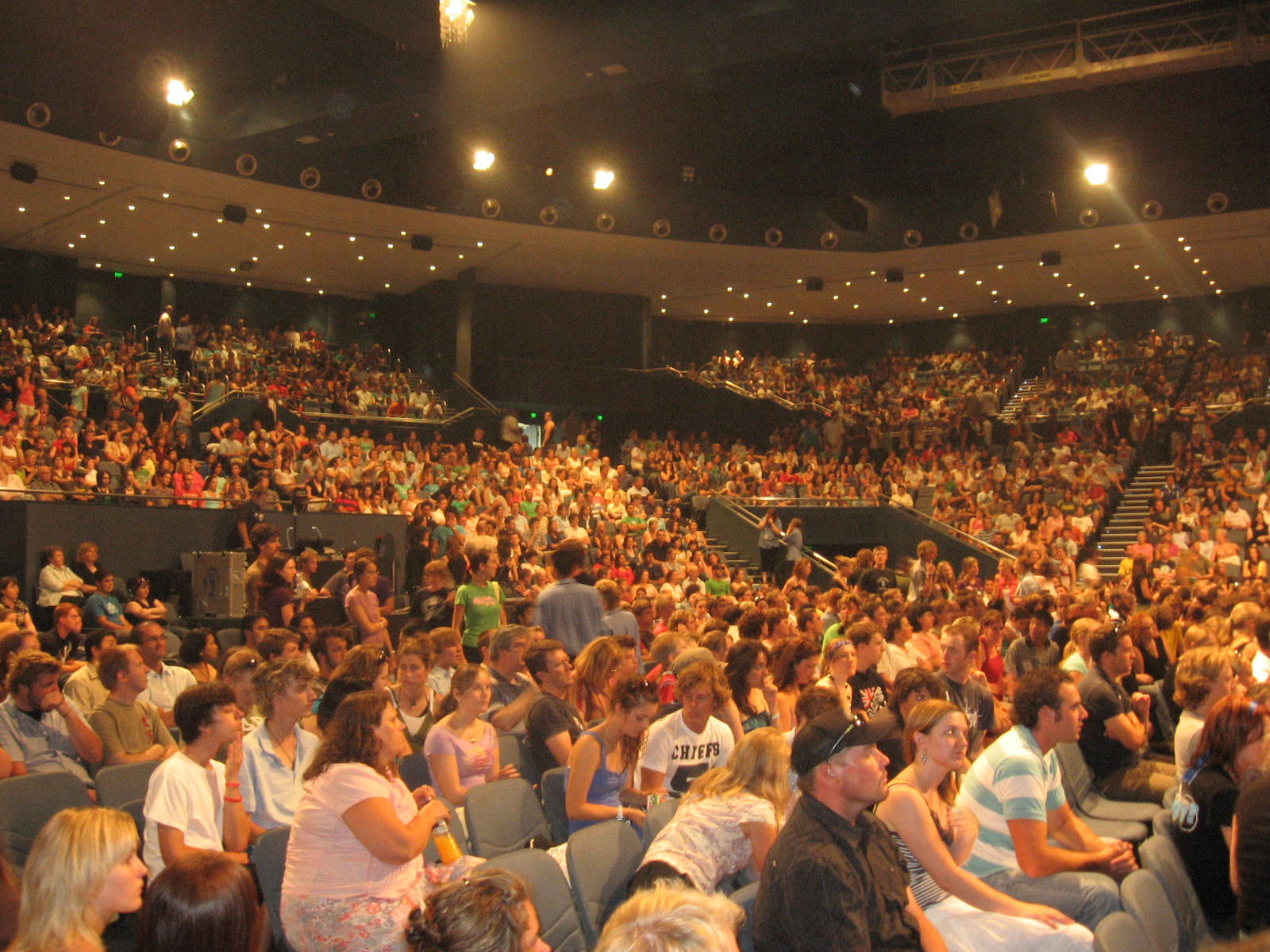
Hillsong Church service in Norwest, New South Wales, Australia

Australian scholar Sam Hey wrote in 2011 that "almost all megachurch developments are Pentecostal, or charismatic and neo-Pentecostal offshoots".

One of the first megachurches in Australia was the Christian Outreach Centre (COC), now the International Network of Churches.

Hillsong Church was founded in 1983 in Sydney, New South Wales, out of two Christian Life Centre churches and has since planted churches all around Australia and the world. Another significant Australian international Pentecostal network is the C3 Global Network, founded in 1980.

== Criticism ==
In 2005, Baptist Pastor Al Sharpton criticized megachurches for focusing on "bedroom morals", statements against same-sex marriage and abortion, by ignoring issues of social justice, such as the immorality of war and the erosion of affirmative action. Some megachurches, such as C3, have similarly been criticized for presenting the church as inclusive while hiding the fact that they are strongly against gay marriage and do not allow sexually active gay members to fully participate in the church.

A study by the Hartford Institute published in 2020 found that 60 percent of American megachurches were members of a Christian denomination, with the remaining 40 percent being nondenominational. In 2018, American professor Scot McKnight of Northern Baptist Theological Seminary criticized nondenominational megachurches for the weak external accountability relationship of their leaders, by not being members of a Christian denomination, further exposing them to abuse of power.

Some megachurches and their pastors have been accused by critics of promoting prosperity theology, where the poor and vulnerable are encouraged to donate their money to the church rather than saving it, in the hopes that God will bless them with wealth. This in turn increases the wealth of the pastors, with some revealed to wear designer clothing during sermons and own luxury vehicles.

== In popular culture ==
- Several documentaries have been released focusing on megachurches, their charismatic leaders and their controversies, such as Unveiled: Surviving La Luz Del Mundo and Secretos del Apostol (focusing on the Mexican megachurch La Luz del Mundo and the crimes of Naasón Joaquín García, the third leader of La Luz del Mundo), God Loves Uganda (focusing on the Miracle Centre Cathedral, a megachurch located in Kampala, the capital of Uganda and led by the famous Ugandan pastor and televangelist Robert Kayanja), The Secrets of Hillsong and Hillsong: A Megachurch Exposed (focusing on Hillsong Church and the scandals of its founder, Brian Houston) and The Billionaire Bishop and the Global Megachurch (focusing on the Universal Church of the Kingdom of God and the numerous controversies of its founder, Edir Macedo).
- One of the main settings of the two-part episode of the thirty-first season of The Simpsons, "Warrin' Priests" is a megachurch located in Traverse City, Michigan, called Blessed Buy Megachurch (in reference to Best Buy), led by a charismatic leader named Reverend Mac (voiced by Kevin Michael Richardson) and of which the episode's main antagonist, Bode Wright (voiced by Pete Holmes) was a member before being expelled for burning the Holy Bible.
- The 2015 Lifetime Movie Network thriller film Megachurch Murder has as its central plot the murder (disguised as a suicide) of Pastor Hamilton Spears (played by Malcolm-Jamal Warner), the charismatic and popular leader of a Southern megachurch.
- The 2016 OWN drama series Greenleaf focuses on a Memphis, Tennessee megachurch called Calvary Fellowship World Ministries, led by Bishop James Greenleaf (played by Keith David), a charismatic and strong religious leader, and his wife, "First Lady" Daisy Mae Greenleaf (played by Lynn Whitfield).
- One of the recurring characters in the 2016 animated sitcom Bordertown, Reverend Fantastic (voiced by John Viener) is a charismatic religious leader who is the head of the unnamed megachurch located in Mexifornia, a city located in the border of California and Mexico which is the main setting of the series.
- One of the main characters in the 2017 psychological thriller First Reformed, Pastor Joel Jeffers (played by Cedric the Entertainer) is the head pastor of the "Abundant Life Church", a megachurch located in Albany, New York.
- The popular HBO comedy-drama series The Righteous Gemstones focuses primarily on The Gemstones Ministries, a church network founded and led by Dr. Eli Gemstone (played by John Goodman and Jake Kelley in his younger version), a charismatic Southern pastor, Christian religious leader and televangelist who is one of the series' main characters, the founder and senior pastor of The Gemstones Ministries. In particular, the main setting of the series is the Gemstone Salvation Center, a megachurch located in North Charleston, South Carolina that is considered the flagship church of Gemstone Ministries and was the first church founded by Eli Gemstone.
- The 2022 mockumentary comedy film Honk for Jesus. Save Your Soul. is set in a Southern Baptist Convention megachurch called "Wander to Greater Paths", led by Pastor Lee-Curtis Childs (played by Sterling K. Brown) and his wife, First Lady Trinitie Childs (played by Regina Hall).

== See also ==
- List of the largest evangelical churches
- List of the largest evangelical church auditoriums
- List of megachurches in the United States

== Bibliography ==
- Hunt, Stephen (2019). Handbook of Megachurches (PDF). Brill. ISBN 9789004412927.
- Loveland, Anne; Wheeler, Otis (2003). From Meetinghouse to Megachurch: A Material and Cultural History. ISBN 0826214800.
