= Hrubý =

Hrubý (feminine Hrubá) is a Czech and Slovak surname, meaning crude, rough, gross or (in the old Czech) big. The last meaning is how the surname was formed. People with this surname include:

- Anna Hruby, Australian actress
- Berta Hrubá, Czech field hockey player
- Aubrey Hruby, American investor
- Jan Hrubý, Czech rock violinist
- Jill Hruby, American engineer
- Joy Hruby, Australian actress, producer, film-maker, author and agent
- Ladislav Hrubý, Czech cross-country skier
- Michaela Hrubá, Czech high jumper
- Robert Hrubý, Czech footballer
- Rudolf Hrubý (1954–2023), Slovak businessman
- Tomáš Hrubý, Czech cyclist
- Vincenz Hruby, Czech chess master
- Vlastimil Hrubý, Czech footballer

The word and its derivatives are also contained in many names of places in the Czech Republic and Slovakia

- Hrubá Skála, a village in Semily district
- Hrubá Vrbka, a village in Hodonín district
- Hrubčice, a village in Prostějov district
- Hrubý Jeseník (Nymburk District), a village in Nymburk district
- Hrubý Jeseník, mountains on the border between Moravia and Silesia
- Hrubý Rohozec, a castle in Semily district
- Hrubý Šúr, a village in Senec district

== See also ==
- Hrubá (disambiguation)
- Hruby Conservatory of Music
