= Morenike =

Yoruba name

- Gender: Female
- Language: Yoruba

Origin
- Origin: Nigerian
- Meaning: I have seen one to cherish
- Region of origin: South-West Nigeria

Other names
- Variant form: Renike

Morẹ́nikẹ́ // is a Nigerian feminine given name of Yoruba origin, which means "I have found one to cherish" or "I am cherished". Its origin can be traced to Southwest Nigeria.

Notable variants of the name includes Morẹ́ni and Ọmọ́reni.

Gloss:

mo - I

rí - see, find

ẹni - person

kẹ́ - cherish, nurture, pet, care for

== Notable people bearing the name ==
- Morenike Atunrase, American basketball player
- Morenike Lasode, Nigerian singer-songwriter
- Morenike Molehin, Nigerian entrepreneur
- Morenike Oluwatoyin Folayan, Nigerian medical scientist
- Morẹ́nikẹ́ Ọláòṣebìkan, Nigerian -Canadian pharmacist
