= Folayan =

Fọláyan
- Gender: Male
- Language: Yoruba

Origin
- Origin: Nigerian
- Meaning: (One who) struts with nobility/dignity.
- Region of origin: South West, Nigeria

Fọláyan is a Nigerian given name and a surname. It is a male name and of Yoruba origin, which means "(One who) struts with nobility/dignity.". Fọláyan is a powerful name with depth and profound meaning. The diminutive forms include Afọláyan, same meaning and Adéfọláyan which means (Royalty struts with wealth.).

== Notable individuals with the name ==
- Chris Folayan, American writer and businessman.
- Nike Folayan (born 1978), British engineer.
- Sabaah Folayan, American filmmaker.
- Victoria Folayan (born 1985), American rugby sevens player.
- Morenike Oluwatoyin Folayan Ukpong (born 1967), Nigerian medical scientist.
- Isaac Fola-Alade, FNIA, D.Sc, OFR (1933 – 2021), Nigerian architect.
