= Clement Olusegun Kolawole =

Nigerian Professor of Language Education, Curriculum and Instruction

- Born: 6 August 1957 (age 69)
- Citizenship: Nigeria
- Education: University of Ibadan
- Employers: University of Ibadan; Trinity University, Yaba, Lagos
- Title: Professor
- Website: Profile at University of Ibadan

Clement Olusegun Kolawole (born August 6, 1957) is the Acting vice chancellor of Trinity University and a Doctor of Philosophy (Ph.D.) in Language Education.

== Early life and education ==
Clement Olusegun Kolawole was born at Iyere-Owo, Ondo State, Nigeria, on August 6, 1957. In 1980 was admitted into the Teachers Grade II program at the African Church Teachers College, Epinmi-Akoko, and completed the program in 1983 Following that, he enrolled for bachelor's degree program at Ondo State University, Ado-Ekiti (known as Ekiti State University), Ado-Ekiti. There, he studied English language and Education in1984 and finished in 1988

In 1990, Clement Olusegun Kolawole obtained a Master of Education (M.Ed.) in Language Education from the University of Ibadan, Ibadan. In 1993, the same university awarded him a Doctor of Philosophy (Ph.D.) in Language Education Clement Olusegun Kolawole became a professor in October 2008

== Academic career ==
Prior to moving to UI in 1998 as a Lecturer II in the Department of Teacher Education, he worked as a Class Teacher at the International School, University of Ibadan (UI) where he started his teaching career, and an Assistant Lecturer at the University of Ado-Ekiti from 1993 to 1996.

From 2011 to 2013, he served as the Dean of the Faculty of Education, making a significant contribution to the growth of the Faculty.

In August 2023, he was appointed as the Acting Vice Chancellor of Trinity University, Yaba, Lagos to succeed the pioneer Vice Chancellor of the University, Professor Charles Korede Ayo.

== Achievements ==
- He held the position of Head of Department (H.O.D) at the Faculty of Education, University of Ibadan
- Senior Lecturer at the Teacher Education Department, University of Ibadan, from 2002-2008
- Convener, Implementation of Continuous Assessment Policy (2018 – 2020).
- Chairman, Visitation Panel to The Polytechnic, Ibadan (2012)

== Awards and honours ==
He was appointed as a Professor by the University of Ibadan in 2008

== Publications ==
- By His Grace Alone: The Concise Autobiography of Clement Olusegun Olaniran Kolawole
- Making Omelette without Breaking Eggs: Improving the Reading Comprehension Skills of English as a Second Language Teachers in Nigeria Secondary Schools

== Membership ==
Clement Olusegun Kolawole is a member of the following

- Nigerian Academy of Education (NAE)
- National Association of Curriculum Theorists (NACT)
- Curriculum Organization of Nigeria (CON)
- Georgia Reading Association (GRA)
- Reading Association of Nigeria (RAN)
- International Reading Association (IRA)
- International Council on Education for Teaching ICET
- International Association of Teachers of English as Foreign Language (ATEL)
- International for the Development of African Languages for Science and Technology (ADALEST)
- Teachers Registration Council of Nigeria (TRCN)
