= Afolayan =

Afọláyan
- Gender: Male
- Language: Yoruba

Origin
- Origin: Nigerian
- Meaning: One who struts with wealth.
- Region of origin: South West, Nigeria

pronunciation

Afọláyan is a Nigerian given name and a surname. It is a male name and of Yoruba origin, which means "One who struts with wealth.". Afọláyan is a powerful name with depth and profound meaning. The diminutive forms include Fọláyan, same meaning and Adéfọláyan which means (Royalty struts with wealth.).

== Notable individuals with the name ==
- Adeyemi Afolayan (1940–1996), Nigerian film actor, director, and producer
- Adeyinka Afolayan, Nigerian biochemist
- Anu Afolayan, Nigerian composer
- Aremu Afolayan (born 1980), Nigerian actor
- Dapo Afolayan (born 1997), British association football player
- Gabriel Afolayan (born 1985), Nigerian actor and singer
- Joseph Afolayan, Nigerian civil engineering academic
- Kunle Afolayan (born 1975), Nigerian actor, film producer, and director
- Moji Afolayan (born 1968), Nigerian actress, film-maker, producer, and director
- Toyin Afolayan (born 1959), Nigerian actress
