= Ekundayo =

- Gender: Unisex
- Language: Yoruba

Origin
- Origin: Nigerian
- Meaning: Weeping has become joy
- Region of origin: South-west Nigeria

EkundayoEkundayo is a Nigerian given name and surname of Yoruba origin meaning "Weeping has become joy." It is traditionally given to a child born after a period of hardship or sorrow, symbolizing a transition from sadness to happiness. Derived from the words “ẹkún” (tears or weeping), “dì” (to become), and “ayọ̀” (joy or happiness), . In Yoruba culture, Ẹkúndayọ̀ embodies the belief that even in difficult times, joy can emerge. Morphologically written as "Ẹkúndayọ̀".

Notable people with the name include:

- Ekundayo Adeyinka Adeyemi (1937–2022), Nigerian architect
- Ekundayo Opaleye (1946–2023), Nigerian politician
- Ekundayo Jayeoba (born 1980), Nigerian footballer
- Larry Ekundayo (born 1982), Nigerian professional boxer
