= Akan Williams =

Nigerian academic

Dean, School of Postgraduate Studies, Covenant University
- Incumbent
- Assumed office November 10, 2020

Acting Vice Chancellor, Covenant University
- In office September 22, 2020 – November 10, 2020
- Preceded by: AAA Atayero
- Succeeded by: Abiodun Adebayo

Personal details
- Born: 16 February 1970 (age 56) Calabar, Cross River state
- Education: University of Calabar; University of Port Harcourt; Covenant University

Akan Williams (born February 16, 1970) is a Nigerian academic, professor of analytical/environmental chemistry, and 6th vice-chancellor of the Covenant University. Prior to succeeding AAA Atayero as Vice-Chancellor, he was the Deputy Vice-Chancellor and Head, Department of Chemistry, Covenant University.

He earned a Bachelor of Science degree in chemistry from the University of Calabar in 1991, an MSc degree in Petroleum Chemistry from the University of Port Harcourt in 2001, and a Ph.D. in Environmental Chemistry from Covenant University.

His research focus on the monitoring of organic pollutants in the environment and a former chairman of the Chemical Society of Nigeria, Ogun State Chapter. He is also a Pastor with the Living Faith Church and serves as the District Pastor, Winners Satellite Fellowship (WSF), Canaan Land.

Williams is married to Lifted Williams, and they have two children.
