= Jeseník (disambiguation) =

Jeseník is a town in the Olomouc Region of the Czech Republic.

Jeseník may also refer to places in the Czech Republic:

- Jeseník District in the Olomouc Region
- Hrubý Jeseník, a mountain range on the Czech–Polish border
- Nízký Jeseník, a highland area in the Czech Republic
- Jeseník nad Odrou, a municipality and village in the Moravian-Silesian Region
- Hrubý Jeseník (Nymburk District), a municipality and village in the Central Bohemian Region
