= Sheriff Folarin =

Nigerian professor of International Relations

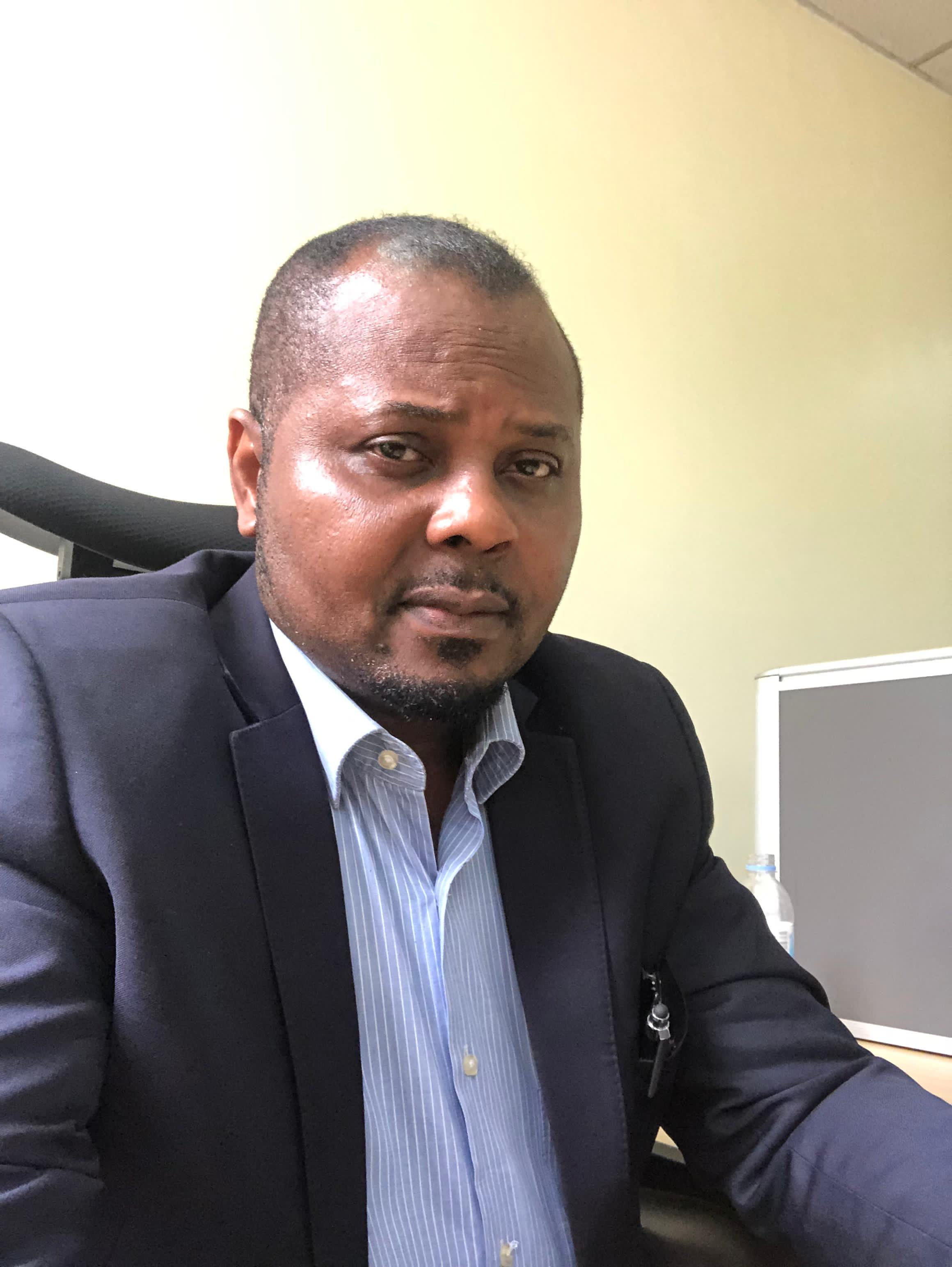
- Born: 15 August 1973 (age 53); Kaduna
- Citizenship: Nigerian, Rwandan
- Education: Oro Nursery and Primary School; Abadina College; University of Ibadan
- Occupations: University teaching; Journalism

Sheriff F. Folarin is a United States-based Nigerian-Rwandan academic and international relations professor, who teaches at Texas State University, University of Rwanda, and the Nnamdi Azikiwe University, Nigeria. He is a Pan-Africanist, and a founder and president of the African Homegrown Development Initiative (AHDI), a non-governmental organization that operates from the United States, Nigeria, and Rwanda. Folarin attained the full rank of Professor of International Relations in 2017 at Covenant University, becoming the first of such in the institution.

In 2020, Professor Folarin was engaged by the Center for Conflict Management of the University of Rwanda to teach and mentor graduate students of the Center, including members of the Senior Command and Staff Course of the Rwandan Defense Force Command and Staff College, and the National Intelligence Academy. Folarin is also a professor-at-large at Ife Institute of Advanced Studies, Ile-Ife, and the Institute for Peace, Security and Development Studies of the Nnamdi Azikiwe University, Nigeria. The University of Johannesburg in South Africa, Institute of Future Diplomacy recently engaged him as a Senior Research Associate.

== Early life and education ==
Sheriff Folarin was born in Kaduna, Kaduna State, Northern Nigeria on 15 August 1973. He originally came from Abeokuta, Ogun State. Folarin had his primary school education in different parts of Northern Nigeria- Kaduna, where he attended LGA Primary School and Army Children School; Niger State, where he went to Bosso Primary School in Minna; and the Catholic mission-owned Oro Nursery and Primary School in Kwara State. Afterward, he proceeded to Benue State for his secondary school education, first at Tilley Gyado College and later at the prestigious Government College Makurdi. After his father retired from the federal public service, which was the reason for the frequent changes of school in the North, he eventually moved with his family to Ibadan, Oyo State in Southwestern Nigeria, where he completed his secondary education, graduating from Abadina College in 1989.

He proceeded to Nigeria’s premier higher institution, the University of Ibadan, and graduated with a Bachelor of Arts (Honors) degree in history, the best-graduating student in his set. In 1993, he won the Oba Lipede Prize in History as the best undergraduate student with prize money and a certificate. Folarin pursued a Master’s degree in political science at his alma mater, Ibadan, and completed the program as one of the top two in a class of about 40 students. He proceeded to undertake a doctoral program at Covenant University and obtained a PhD in International Relations in 2010.

== Career ==
On completion of his Master’s degree, Folarin pursued a career in journalism. He had been a campus journalist between 1992 and 1996, which lead to him being chosen as the president of the Union of Campus Journalists (UCJ) between 1994 and 1996. He worked at the African Newspapers of Nigeria (ANN) Plc, publisher of Nigerian Tribune, the nation’s first independent newspaper. At Tribune, he worked as a investigative journalist. He switched between education and conflict reporter roles, and in 1999, his coverage of the Ife-Modakeke conflict and the Fulani-Yoruba clashes in Shaki, Oyo State earned him the recognition of other media organizations like Reuters, which approached him with job or special assignment offers. His job at Nigerian Tribune was, however, not going to last long as the authorities of his alma mater, the University of Ibadan, directly approached him and his Managing Director at Tribune to accept a teaching offer in the Department of History. After much consideration and counsel from parents and some colleagues, he quit journalism professionally and began lecturing appointment at the Ibadan School of History, University of Ibadan.

Afterward, Folarin moved to Covenant University where he worked for almost 19 years. From the formation of student-based organizations such as literary and debate societies to the tour guides and laying a solid foundation for institutional internationalization as the pioneer and a two-time head of the institution’s international office, the atmosphere was challenging for growth and innovation. Folarin has dozens of scholarly publications, including over 90 articles in peer-reviewed journals that are indexed in competent scientific databases such as Google Scholar, Scopus, Web of Science, and Semantics Scholar; and seven books. These books include Homeland Security and Terrorism in Nigeria (Lexington Books, 2024), Declining Hegemonic Foreign Policies of Nigeria (Palgrave Macmillan, 2024), Rwanda’s Radical Transformation (Palgrave Macmillan, 2023), and United Nations and Sustainable Development Goals (Springer, 2022).

Between 2000 and 2025, Folarin has taught or served in a full-time or visiting capacity, or an examiner or academic fellowship role in several universities, including Nigeria, Rwanda, South Africa, and the United States. These institutions include Covenant University, the University of Ibadan, the University of South Carolina, Landmark University, the University of Rwanda, and Texas State University. In the university space, he has served in leadership positions, including university committee chair, director, head of department, coordinator of research syndicates, and university orator. In addition to this, he has sat on the doctoral dissertation/thesis committees of 54 candidates, serving in different capacities- chair, external or internal examiner, or supervisor of PhD candidates, among whom are 13 that he supervised. At the national level, he was President of the All-Nigeria Universities Debate Council between 2019 and 2021, Vice President and Southwest Coordinator of the same national body between 2015 and 2019, and served on numerous accreditation panels of the National Universities Commission.

Professor Folarin is a recipient of several fellowships and grants. In 2024, he won the competitive Texas COIL Grant for international learning collaboration, and in 2015, he was a co-awardee of the Carnegie African Diaspora Fellowship Program. In 2007, he was awarded the Study of United States Institute Fellowship. In 2020, he chaired the United Nations at 75 International Academic Conference, and won The Conversation Africa Science Award the same year. He is currently the editor-in-chief of the Africa Symposia Issue and associate editor-in-chief of the Good Governance Worldwide journal of the American Society for Public Administration. He also edited the Covenant University Journal of Politics and International Politics between 2014 and 2021.

== Personal life ==
Folarin is married and has three children. He enjoys reading, writing, watching or playing soccer, and listening to music. He enjoys traveling across the globe. When he is not busy or traveling, he enjoys staying home with his family.
