= Aderemi Atayero =

Nigerian academic

Aderemi Atayero FSAN

Vice Chancellor of Covenant University
- In office 2016–2020
- Preceded by: Charles Ayo
- Succeeded by: Akan Williams

Vice Chancellor of Nigerian University of Technology and Management
- In office July 2026 – Oct 2026

Personal details
- Born: Aderemi Aaron-Anthony Atayero; 26 October 1969 (age 57)
- Education: Moscow State Technical University of Civil Aviation

Aderemi Aaron-Anthony Atayero (born 26 October 1969, in Ikeja) is a Nigerian engineer and the pioneer Vice Chancellor of the Nigerian University of Technology and Management (NUTM). Prior to this role, he was the 4th substantive vice chancellor of Covenant University, Nigeria. He previously served as the first academic deputy vice-chancellor, Coordinator School of Engineering, and twice as head of department of Electrical and Information Engineering of Covenant University.

Atayero is a senior research fellow of the International Association of Research Scholars and Administrators, and a fellow of the Science Association of Nigeria (FSAN).

== Education and career ==
Atayero got his first degree a Bachelor of Science in radio engineering, graduating summa cum laude in 1992 from Moscow Institute of Technology (MIT).

In 1994, he proceeded for his masters in satellite communication systems. He studied in Moscow State Technical University of Civil Aviation (MSTUCA) where he earned his PhD during the year 2000. Atayero is the team lead of the Covenant University Smart City (SmartCU) Project, as well as the head of Covenant University IoT-Enabled Smart & Connected Communities Research Cluster.

Atayero received his first "appreciation Russian Government stipend" as a student from 1988 to 1994. He then was given a scholarship by the Federal Government of Nigeria Scholarship, Bureau for External Aide from 1988 to 1994. In 2005, he was awarded a Grant for FPGA and VHDL Workshop by the International Center for Theoretical Physics (Trieste, Italy), Kumasi Ghana.

== Early life and family ==
Atayero was born on 26 October 1969, in Ikeja, Lagos State. He is from Ilesa West Local Government Area in Ijeshaland, Osun State, Nigeria. Born to a mobile public servant father who served as a Peace Officer and a medical practitioner mother, Atayero was always on the move from one part of Nigeria to the other. He had his primary education at the St. Agnes Primary School, Ikeja, Lagos. Due to his father's traveling, he went to three different schools for his secondary education.

Atayero is married to a Russian wife, Olga, with whom he has three sons: Remi, Femi and Fela Atayero.
