= Aize Obayan =

Nigerian education administrator (1960–2019)

Vice Chancellor of Covenant University
- In office 2005 – December 2012
- Preceded by: Jonathan Aremu
- Succeeded by: Charles Ayo

Vice Chancellor of Landmark University
- In office 2015–2017
- Preceded by: Rotimi Ajayi
- Succeeded by: Adeniyi Olayanju

Personal details
- Born: Aize Oloigbe Imouokhome; 4 March 1960
- Died: 29 January 2019 (aged 58)
- Spouse: Adetokunbo Obayan (late)
- Children: 2
- Education: Bachelor of Education in English, University of Benin, 1979. PhD., University of Ilorin

Aize Obayan (4 March 1960 – 29 January 2019) was a Nigerian educational administrator and a professor of counselling with specialization in multicultural aspects of Human Behavioural Disposition.

== Education and career ==
Obayan attended St Andrews Scotland for her 'A' levels. She later proceeded for her first degree in B.Ed. (English) at the University of Benin (Nigeria) between 1979 and 1982. Obayan obtained her PhD from the University of Ilorin, thereafter UNILORIN employed her as an assistant lecturer, in 1986, she rose through the ranks to become an associate professor (AP) in 1995 and prior to joining Covenant University, she was a senior lecturer at the University of Roehampton, UK.

Obayan served as Vice-Chancellor of Covenant University, Canaanland, Ota, Nigeria from 2005 until December 2012, when she was replaced by Charles Ayo. She also was the vice chancellor of Landmark University, Omu-Aran, Kwara State and director of African Leadership Development Centre in Covenant University.

== Personal life ==
She was married to Adetokunbo Obayan of the leadership consultancy firm Adetokunbo Obayan and Associates; he died in 2017. They had two adult children together namely Joshua and Toluwani. She died on 29 January 2019. She was a born again Christian.

== Selected works ==
- Adelekan, M. L., Abiodun, O. A., Obayan, A. O., Oni, G., & Ogunremi, O. O. (1992). Prevalence and pattern of substance use among undergraduates in a Nigerian University.
- Adelekan, M. L., Ndom, R., & Obayan, A. I. (1996). Monitoring trends in substance use through a repeat cross-sectional survey in a Nigerian university.
- Adelekan, M. L., Ndom, R., & Obayan, A. I. (1996). Monitoring trends in substance use through a repeat cross-sectional survey in a Nigerian university.
- Adelekan, M. L., Abiodun, O. A., Imouokhome-Obayan, A. O., Oni, G. A., & Ogunremi, O. O. (1993). Psychosocial correlates of alcohol, tobacco and cannabis use: findings from a Nigerian university.
- Obayan, A. (2010). The Role of Nigerian Universities in Bridging the Digital Divide in the Design of Sustainable Buildings.
- Obayan, A., Awonuga, C., & Ekeanyanwu, N. (Eds.). (2012). The Idea of a University. Covenant University Press.
- Imouokhome Obayan, A. O. (1995). Changing perspectives in the extended family system in Nigeria: implications for family dynamics and Counselling.
- Obayan, A. (2006). Implementing Quality Education Standards: A Consideration Of The Private University Initiatives.
- Obayan, A. I., & Jimoh-Cook, K. Paternal acceptance/rejection and children's academic achievement-a study of selected secondary school children in and around Ilorin metropolis. Nigerian Journal of Educational Foundations.
- Agbude, G., Obayan, A., & Abasilim, U. D. (2015). Innovative Pathways for Effective E-Governance in Africa: The Imperative of Authentic Leadership. Acta Universitatis Danubius. Administration, 7(2).
- Obayan, A. (1991). Emotional Responsiveness, Stability and Maternal Acceptance: a study of the perceptions of Nigerian Children. Nigerian Journal of Educational Foundations, 2(2), 132–142.
- Obayan, A.O.I. (1994). "Children in a world of changing maternal occupational patterns: the Nigerian experience".

== See also ==
Academics' Perceptions of Private University Establishment Standards and Teaching Quality
