= David Oyedepo =

Nigerian clergyman (born 1954)

Bishop David Oyedepo
- Olaniyi
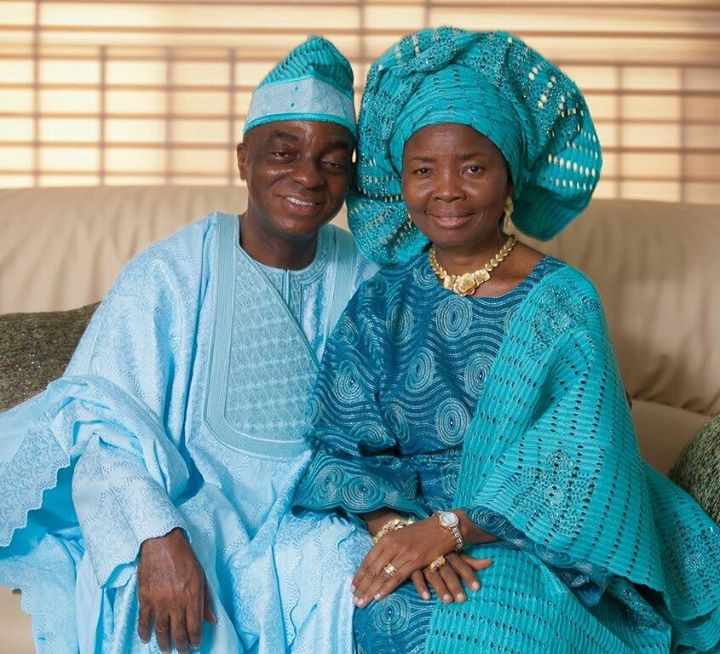
- Oyedepo and his wife
- Born: David Olaniyi Oyedepo; 27 September 1954 (age 72); Omu-Aran, Northern Region, British Nigeria (now in Kwara State, Nigeria)
- Other name: BDO
- Education: Kwara State Polytechnic (HND, Architecture)
- Occupations: Pastor, Author, Televangelist
- Known for: Preaching of the Word of Faith
- Title: President/Founder, Living Faith Church Worldwide
- Spouse: Faith Abiola Oyedepo née Akano (m. 1982)
- Children: David Oyedepo Jnr (Son); Isaac Oyedepo (Son); Love Oyedepo-Ogah (Daughter); Joyce Abodunrin (Daughter)
- Parent(s): Ibrahim and Dorcas Morenike Oyedepo
- Website: davidoyedepo.org

David Olaniyi Oyedepo (born 27 September 1954) is a Nigerian preacher, the founder of The Winner's Chapel officially known as the Living Faith Church Worldwide, and Senior Pastor of the Faith Tabernacle in Ota, Ogun State, Nigeria. The church is also known as Winners' Chapel International. The Winners' Chapel International network of churches is located in over 300 cities throughout the world.

Oyedepo has been regarded as one of the pioneers of the Christian charismatic movement in Africa. He is the chancellor of Covenant University and Landmark University, and was named in 2011 by Forbes magazine as the richest pastor in Nigeria.

== Early life ==
David Olaniyi Oyedepo was born in Osogbo, Nigeria, but originates from Omu-Aran, Irepodun Local Government Area of Kwara State. He was raised in a mixed-religious family. His father, Ibrahim, was a Muslim healer. His mother, Dorcas, was a member of the Holy Order of the Cherubim and Seraphim Movement Church (C&S), a branch of the Aladura movement in Nigeria. He was raised by his grandmother in Osogbo, who introduced him to Christianity.

== Education ==
Oyedepo studied architecture at the Kwara State Polytechnic, Kwara State.

== Career ==
Oyedepo worked briefly with the Federal Ministry of Housing, in Ilorin before resigning to concentrate on missionary work.

== Ministry ==
David Oyedepo says that he was born again on 15 February 1969 when he was 15.

On 8 May 1981, Oyedepo convened a meeting with a group which later would go on to become his "Power House", made up of about 70 young men and women.

On 17 September 1983, Pastor Enoch Adeboye, General Overseer of the Redeemed Christian Church of God, ordained David and his wife, Florence Abiola Akano (known as Faith Abiola Oyedepo) to become pastors and officially commissioned the new church. Five years later, Oyedepo was ordained as Bishop by his life mentor, the late Archbishop Benson Idahosa.

According to Forbes, Oyedepo is the wealthiest preacher in the world with a net worth of over US$150 million. The church owns four private jets and several buildings, including in London and the US. Oyedepo is an author and publisher. He is the chairman or publisher of Dominion Publishing House (DPH), a publishing arm of the ministry. DPH has over 4 million prints in circulation to date. Through Oyedepo; Covenant University, Faith Academy, and Kingdom Heritage Model Schools have been established to equip the youth for global impact. The construction of a third university named Crown University is already underway, located in Calabar, Cross River, Nigeria.

In 1998, Oyedepo claimed he was instructed by God to build a new base for the commission to accommodate the increasing number of worshippers. This resulted in Oyedepo's church's acquisition of the initial 530-acre (2.1 km^{2}) facility, known as Canaanland, which serves as the headquarters. It is the home of the 50,000-seat capacity auditorium, the 'Faith Tabernacle'. This was a feat also recorded by the Guinness Book of Records.

Construction was completed within 12 months. Reports also claimed that this building was built debt-free. This 50,000-seat edifice was dedicated on 18 September 1999.

Canaanland is in Ota, Ogun state, and is the 5,000-acre (20 km^{2}) estate and campus, that houses The 50,000-seat auditorium, the church secretariat, the church's youth chapel, a primary school called Kingdom heritage model school, a full boarding mission secondary school called Faith Academy, with over 1,500 students and the Covenant University facilities - which accommodates over 7,000 students, fully resident in ultra-modern hostel facilities – with fully equipped faculty buildings and numerous staff housing facilities. Canaanland campus also has for-profit establishments operated by the church such as a bakery, a bottled water processing plant, a petrol station, various restaurants and shopping stores, and several residential houses that provide for the over 2,000 church employees and guesthouses. Four banks are also present on this Estate, three of which are branches of external commercial banks and one which is a community and micro-finance Bank operated by the Church. The whole of Canaanland which includes a proposed 15,000 housing estate known as Canaan City had increased to 17,000 acres as of 2012.

The Ministry's biggest annual meeting Shiloh is held every December in the same Faith Tabernacle and often welcomes thousands of congregants across the world. The ministry is currently building a 100,000-seater auditorium called the "Ark", which is reputed to be the building with the largest span in the world. When the auditorium was first announced in 2015, it was called the Faith Theatre.

== Christian Ministry ==
The teachings of Oyedepo have put him in the category of what is commonly called the Word of Faith Movement. He has referred to principal exponents of the Faith Movement such as Kenneth Copeland, Gloria Copeland, the late Kenneth Hagin, E. W. Kenyon, T. L. Osborn, Smith Wigglesworth as well as renowned Nigerian preachers; Enoch Adeboye and the late Benson Idahosa as mentors. As with many of his influences, Oyedepo has been described as a preacher of the prosperity gospel.

Winners' Chapel International operates a Bible training program known as the Word of Faith Bible Institute for members and non-members alike to develop knowledge of Christian principles as well as to develop leaders and future pastors. The institute is run in major branches of the Church.

Nigerian pastor Korede Komaiya served under Oyedepo at Winners' Chapel before establishing The Master's Place International Church.

Oyedepo has criticised corruption in Africa as a whole and poor leadership in government.

He was a critic of Nigeria's former president Muhammadu Buhari.

== Book publishing ==
Oyedepo's church operates its own publishing house called Dominion Publishing House (DPH), commissioned on 5 December 1992, which has published over 70 Christian, inspirational and motivational books, mini-books, magazines and other resources.

== Family ==
In August 1982, Oyedepo married Florence Abiola Akano. They have four children together.

== Awards and recognition ==
- Honorary Doctor of Divinity – Bethel Graduate School of Theology Riverside California
- Fellow of the Nigerian Society for Financial Research (FNSFR)
- National Honour: A road was named after him by the Federal Government of Nigeria in the Gwarinpa area of the Federal Capital Territory, Abuja, during the Independence day celebrations of 2008.
