= Nigeria Higher Education Foundation =

Nigerian non-profit organization

- Abbreviation: NHEF
- Formation: 2004; 22 years ago
- Founders: John D. and Catherine T. MacArthur Foundation.
- Type: private operating foundation
- Headquarters: New York, United States of America
- Region served: Nigeria
- Key people: Walé Adeosun, CFA. Chairman
- Website: thenhef.org

The Nigeria Higher Education Foundation (NHEF) is a Nigerian American non-profit organization founded in 2004 by John D. and Catherine T. MacArthur Foundation and headquartered in New York. Its board is made up of Nigerian Americans from different sectors. Its current chairman is Walé Adeosun, CFA.

== History and objectives ==
The Nigeria Higher Education Foundation was founded in 2004 as a social enterprise. The foundation aims to improve the educational capacity of Nigerian higher Institutions and develop future leaders. It pursues its goal of advancing Nigeria's higher education through coordinated skills development and leadership mentorship.

The foundation partners include the Ahmadu Bello University, Bayero University, Nigerian University of Technology and Management, University of Ibadan, University of Lagos, University of Nigeria, Nsukka, and the University of Port Harcourt.

== Administration ==
=== Board of Directors ===
The Chairman of the Board of Directors is Walé Adeosun, CFA. Other members of the board of directors include;

- Ifeoma Nwokorie, DDS, MBA (Vice Chairman)
- Kamal Pallan (Treasurer)
- Titi Odunfa-Adeoye (Secretary)
- Johnbull Okpara (Member)
- Dr. Femi Pitan (Member)
- Professor Gbenga G. Ogedegbe (Member)
- Obi Nwokorie (Member)
- Samaila Zubairu (Member)

=== Management Team ===
- Claire Jemide (Executive Director, NHEF)
- Anne Okaomee, PhD (Executive Director, University Advancement Program)
- Precious Amah (Strategic Partnerships)
- Oluwajuwon Obaniyi, PMP (Programs & Digital Transformation)
- Ladi Adeosun (Donor Relations)
- Ogochukwu Aleke (Research Development)

== Programs ==
=== Student Programs ===
The student programs comprise various initiatives run by the foundation to develop capacity among Nigerian higher education students. These programs include:

- The NHEF Scholars program. The program was launched in 2016 in partnership with partner universities to recruit final year students at its partner Nigerian Universities who have shown excellence in their academics, leadership roles, and other community development activities.
- The NHEF Graduate Doctors Program. This program was established to develop leadership skills and professional development of medical doctors who had completed housemanship but were waiting for full practice.
- The NHEF Online Skills Academy (OSA). This program was established during the COVID-19 lockdown period to build the skills of students and young professionals virtually to enable better output in their various industries.
- The NHEF Industry Areas. This program provides students with internship opportunities to gain practical experiences in the Financial Services & Consulting, Law, Technology, and Engineering sectors.

=== Faculty Programs ===
The faculty programs are developed towards building capacity among higher education faculty members in partner universities while providing fellowship opportunities and practical grant writing training. These programs include:

- The NHEF Faculty Program. This program is a capacity development program to expand faculty knowledge in research, 21st-century teaching, grant writing, and program assessment. Participants are selected from partner universities in Nigeria and trained for a week.
- Centre to Advance Research on Health in Africa (CAReH Africa). The CAReH aims to advance healthcare in Africa by improving the capacity of faculty members in the field of Engineering, Medicine, and Sciences. It involves partnership with faculty members from other parts of the world to build capacity and share knowledge to improve Healthcare in Nigeria.
- The NHEF Higher Education Forum. This forum brings together higher education leaders from different departments and disciplines in Nigeria and the United States to discuss practical ways to enhance education in Africa and strengthen the capacity of the Education sector and the African economy.

=== Administrative Programs ===
The administrative programs are conducted to support selected universities in Nigeria through coordinated training aimed at improving institutional capacity and advancement for long-term growth, visibility, and resource deployment. These programs include:

- The NHEF Higher Education Leadership and Transformation Program is designed for vice-chancellors of partner universities to brainstorm on issues, training, and workshops that will strengthen institutional leadership, capacity, and improve service delivery in the Nigerian higher education sector.
- The National University Advancement Program (NUAP). This program focuses on strengthening permanent institutional development, building strategic partnerships across Nigeria's higher education institutions, and elevating institutional development.

== Impacts ==
- In 2026, the foundation partnered with the Federal Ministry of Education under the Dr. Tunji Alausa led administration to launch the National University Advancement Program (NUAP), geared at improving capacity, innovation, and development in Nigeria's higher education sector.
- In 2026, as part of its 10th anniversary celebration of the NHEF Scholars program, the foundation expanded access to its 2026 scholars' program for 48 hours to include students from non-partner universities in Nigeria.
