= Landmark University =

Private Christian university in Nigeria

- Other name: LMU
- Motto: Breaking New Grounds
- Type: Christian Private (faith-based)
- Established: March 21, 2011
- Affiliations: International Institute of Tropical Agriculture (IITA), National Space Research and Development Agency (NASRDA), National Universities Commission (NUC)
- Chancellor: Dr. David O. Oyedepo
- Vice-Chancellor: Professor Kolawole O. Ajanaku
- Students: 2684 (2014)
- Location: Omu Aran, Kwara State, Nigeria
- Campus: Omu-Aran
- Language: English
- Colours: Green, Gold and Brown
- Nickname: Pathfinders
- Website: lmu.edu.ng

Landmark University is a private Christian university, affiliated with the Living Faith Church Worldwide and located in Omu-Aran, Kwara State, Nigeria. In 2014, it was featured among the top five universities in Nigeria by Webometrics.

== Agrarian revolutionary drive ==
The chancellor of Landmark University has on multiple occasions highlighted that the university is aimed at improving the agricultural sector of Nigeria and Africa at large. Before the Oil boom of the 1970s, Nigeria's economy was thriving as an agrarian economy and the nation gave attention to Agriculture. After the Oil Boom, the agriculture industry in Nigeria has been on a decline, the Nation that was a one-time exporter of several cash crops has become import-dependent so much that it cannot on its own feed its population talk less of exporting to other countries.

The university encourages its students to venture into agriculture whether it is their core discipline or not and encourages the enrolment of Nigerian students into Agriculture-related courses through scholarships and Career talks. In addition to this, the university has pioneered a Certificate and Diploma Course in "Agri-preneurship" in Nigeria, a program designed to enlighten its participants on the entrepreneurial opportunities that exist in Agriculture.

The university has made ties with several leading Agriculture Institutions both in Research and practice and many other institutions in the pursuance of their agrarian revolutionary drive. Some of these institutions are the International Institute of Tropical Agriculture (IITA) and the National Space Research and Development Agency (NASRDA).

In nearly 7 years of existence, the university runs 6 Agriculture related programs, namely Agricultural Economics, Agricultural Extension and Rural Development, Animal Science, Crop Science, Soil Science and Agricultural and Biosystems Engineering and has graduated over 388 agriculture professionals. The school also has a total of 1,059 hectares of farming land; 320 hectares on the university property in Omu-Aran, Kwara State, 354 hectares at Eleyin Village along the Omu-Aran-Ilorin highway and 385 hectares at Agbonda also in Kwara State. According to the former Vice-chancellor of the school, Professor Aize Obayan, Landmark University produces most of the food items consumed on its campus and sells farm produce to its neighbouring communities. Some of the agricultural products of the university's farm are eggs, frozen chicken, fish, soya beans, cassava, rice, fufu flour and many others including innovative agricultural products like the Brown Rice.

== Vice-chancellors ==
- Mathew Ajayi - 2011 to July 2014.
- Joseph Afolayan - August 2014-August 2015
- Aize Obayan - August 2015 – July 2017
- Olayanju Adeniyi - August 2017 – September 2021

The current vice-chancellor is Kolawole O. Ajanaku who replaced Charity Aremu.

== See also ==
- Landmark University Secondary School
- Education in Nigeria
- Covenant University
