= Faith Tabernacle =

Coordinates: 6°40′36.1″N 3°10′02.2″E

- Faith Tabernacle
- Location: Lagos
- Country: Nigeria
- Denomination: Neo-charismatic movement
- Website: faithtabernacle.org.ng

History
- Founded: December 11, 1983
- Founder: David Oyedepo

Specifications
- Capacity: 50,400

Faith Tabernacle is an evangelical megachurch and the headquarters church of Living Faith Church Worldwide. It is at Canaanland, Ota, Lagos, Nigeria, current neo-charismatic movement. The senior pastor of this community is David Oyedepo since its founding in 1983. In 2023, the attendance is 100,000+ people.

== Background ==
David Oyedepo at age 26, had a vision for his ministry. The Church was founded on December 11, 1983. In 2014, Living Faith Church Worldwide is in 65 countries. In 2020, Faith Tabernacle has an attendance of 50,000 people.

== Building ==
Canaanland was procured in 1998 and was initially 560 acres (2.3 km^{2}), it is in Ota, Ogun, Nigeria. The church's international headquarters, Faith Tabernacle, was built in Cannanland between 1998 and 1999, taking twelve months to complete. The foundation laying took place on August 29, 1998.

In 1999, the Faith Tabernacle was inaugurated with 50,400 seats. Faith Tabernacle was reputed to be the world's largest church in terms of capacity. It covers about 70 hectares and is built inside the complex called Canaanland, with a size of more than 2000 hectares (20km2) in Ota, a suburb of Lagos. The church building was constructed under 12 months and dedicated in September 1999.

== See also ==
- List of the largest evangelical church auditoriums
