= Gloria Oloruntobi =

Nigerian comedienne

- Born: 6 February 1997 (age 29)
- Other name: Maraji
- Education: Covenant University
- Occupations: Content creator, comedienne, skit maker

Gloria Oloruntobi (born February 6, 1997), better known as Maraji, is a Nigerian comedian. She started her career making lip sync videos and miming songs. Maraji role-plays in her comedy skits and switches between accents and vocal pitches to suit each character she plays.

== Education ==
Maraji is from Edo State. She graduated with a bachelor's degree in international relations from Covenant University in 2017.

Maraji was featured in the music videos for Falz's "Something Light" and Yemi Alade's "Single and Searching".

== Awards and nominations ==
- Maraji was nominated for Prize for Comedy at the 2017 and 2018 Future Awards Africa.
- She was also nominated for Comedy Act of the Year at the 2018 City People Music Awards.
