= Nubi Achebo =

Nigerian academic and Professor

Nubi Achebo is a Nigerian academic and Professor of Management currently serving as Director of Academic Planning at the Nigerian University of Technology and Management (NUTM), Lagos. His research interest focuses on instructional technology, sustainability leadership, artificial intelligence, supply chain management and gender inclusion.

== Education and career ==
Achebo earned a Bachelor of Arts degree in Education History/Education from the University of Ife (now Obafemi Awolowo University), a Master of Education degree in Instructional Communications from East Tennessee State University and PhD degree in Curriculum and Instructional Technology from Southern Illinois University Carbondale. Achebo later earned additional degrees including an MBA in Leadership and Sustainability from the University of Cumbria, United Kingdom, and a Doctorate in Management Studies (DMA) in (Supply Chain Management).

Achebo is the current Director, Academic Planning at the Nigerian University of Technology and Management (NUTM), Lagos. He previously served at Lagos Business School (LBS) as MBA Director and later as Director of Learning Innovation.
