= Ife Durosinmi-Etti =

Nigerian business executive and author

Ifedayo Durosinmi-Etti
- Born: Ifedayo Khadijah Adegbenro; December 6, 1988 (age 37)
- Education: Covenant University (B.S.); Coventry University (M.B.A); Saïd Business School
- Occupations: Author; Business executive
- Years active: 2015 - date
- Organizations: Herconomy; Parliamo Bambini
- Title: CEO
- Spouse: Abdulgafar Eniola Durosinmi-Etti
- Awards: 2016 Tony Elumelu Foundation Award; 2021 Mandela Washington Fellow; 2022 ELOY Award

Ifedayo Khadijah Durosinmi-Etti known as Ife Durosinmi-Etti, (born 6 December 1988), is a Nigerian business executive, author and global leader.

== Background and education ==
Durosinmi-Etti went to Vivian Fowler Memorial College for Girls for her secondary school education. She later attended Covenant University, where she attained a degree in Biochemistry. However, she was initially studying chemical engineering, as advised by her mother. This was due to the fact that that was the same profession of her father, even though she did not have a solid interest in the career path. She would later, after a couple of undergraduate years, switch to biochemistry as she realized she was not up for the calculations that chemical engineering entailed. After attaining her first degree, she went on to attend Coventry University, where she got a Masters in Business Administration (MBA) in Global Business and also Saïd Business School.

== Career ==
After her first degree, Durosinmi-Etti started her career in a marketing firm, Aspire Acquisitions. Her second job was in the fashion retail company, Arcadia Group. Both organizations were located in London. She decided to pursue a career in marketing after her stint in the field and this pushed her to get an MBA in Global Business from Coventry University. Upon graduation, she worked with Heineken - through Nigerian Breweries, because Nigerian breweries have Heineken franchising rights in Nigeria. She was recruited as a Young African Talent (YAT). She worked for Heineken for five years, before she quit to pursue a career as an independent entrepreneur.

The first company she founded was Parliamo Bambini, alongside Olamide Olatunbosun. The company was borne out the need for an indigenous Nigerian baby furniture company, which she realized to the hassles she faced having to import baby furniture from the UK to Nigeria when she had her first child. This enveadour earned her a Tony Elumelu Foundation award for entrepreneur, alongside her business partner.

Her second company, Herconomy, formerly named AGS Tribe, is a fintech company that empowers women by giving out business grants, fellowships and scholarships to them. She started out by raising $600,000 through crowd funding on social media, Instagram, to finance the first disbursement of grants. She later got into a collaboration with Amazon, in a partnership aimed at getting business funds to the minority female demographic and recruitment. She is the first Nigerian recruitment partner of Amazon. The company also focuses on peer-to-peer recommendations by members, encouraging its member to bring more women to come access grants and capitals.

She also focuses on educating women about building their businesses. Her book Accessing Grants for Start-ups has the erstwhile governor of Lagos State, Akinwunmi Ambode as the writer of its foreword.

Ifedayo is also an associate member of the Advertising Practitioners Council of Nigeria (APCON).

== Recognition ==
Durosinmi-Etti is a 2016 recipient of the Tony Elumelu Foundation entrepreneur award. She was recognized alongside Olamide Olatunbosun for starting up Parliamo Bambini, a kids furniture company. She is a member of the Youth Advisory Council, a World Bank advisory and advocacy role where she specializes in proffering solutions for Youth Employment. She was also named a peace scholar by the Ministry of Foreign Affairs of the Netherlands.

In 2017, Durosinmi-Etti received an award from her alma mater Vivian Fowler Memorial College for Girls in recognition of her contribution to women's empowerment. In 2018, she also received the Women's Advocacy Award from the West African Leadership Organization; for her dedication to the socioeconomic and equality development in West Africa. In 2018, she was one of the panelists at Harvard University during their African Development Conference, where they discussed the role of women in democracy and it is called consequent impacts on African businesses.

In June 2020, Ife was featured in the Visual Collaborative electronic catalog themed Oxygen, under the Polaris series. She was interviewed alongside others from around the world.

In 2021, she was selected as one of the Mandela Washington Fellows. She was also one of NASDAQ's milestone makers entrepreneurs of 2021/2022. She was also honored by Amstel Malta under the theme Break The Bias, for her effort in promoting inclusiveness in the Nigerian business stratosphere, by encouraging women to get into business. She also was listed by This Day as one of the leading Nigerian females in tech in 2022.

She was the winner of the ELOY Awards for the category of the “Woman Who Inspires”.

== Personal life ==
She married Abdul-Gafaar Eniola Durosinmi-Etti in December 2014. Together they have two children - a girl and a boy. In 2020, she survived a COVID-19 infection.
