= Living Faith Church Worldwide =

WINNER'S CHAPEL

- Classification: Evangelicalism
- Theology: Charismatic
- Headquarters: Canaanland, Km. 10, Idiroko Road, Ota, Ogun State, Nigeria
- Founder: Bishop David Oyedepo
- Origin: May 2, 1981 (45 years ago) Ilesha, Nigeria
- Official website: faithtabernacle.org.ng

Living Faith Church Worldwide (also known as Winners' Chapel) is an international Evangelical charismatic Christian denomination. The headquarters is located in Ota, Ogun State, Nigeria. The organization has since become a global network of churches with over 6 million members in 147 countries.

== History ==
The beginning of the church manifested on May 2, 1981, when David Oyedepo (aged 26) had a spiritual encounter while lodging in one of the rooms within the International Hotel located in the Omi-Asoro Quarters of Ilesa City, in the present-day Osun State of Nigeria. He claimed to have had an eighteen-hour supernatural encounter which was a vision from God. God spoke to him saying, "In the beginning, it was not so, now the hour has come to liberate the world from all oppressions of the devil, through the preaching of the Word of faith; and I am sending you to undertake this task". In 1983, the church began operating with four members on December 11.

=== Faith Tabernacle ===
Canaanland was procured in 1998 and was initially 560 acres (2.3 km^{2}). It is in Ota, Ogun, Nigeria. The church's international headquarters, Faith Tabernacle, was built in Cannanland between 1998 and 1999, taking twelve months to complete. The foundation laying took place on August 29, 1998.

In 1999, the Faith Tabernacle was inaugurated with 50,400 seats.

On Dec 11 2013, Oyedepo's first son, David Oyedepo Jnr, ministered for the first time at the church's annual Shiloh gathering.

In December 2015, Oyedepo Jnr became the resident pastor of the Faith Tabernacle.

=== The Ark ===
In 2019, Bishop Oyedepo announced the commencement of the construction of a 100,000-capacity sanctuary called "The Ark" (It was formerly called Faith Theatre). The Ark will specifically include a 20 Floor Mission Tower (International Headquarters Facility). In 2021, it began construction of a temple called The Ark with 109,345 seats, next to Faith Tabernacle.

== Organization ==
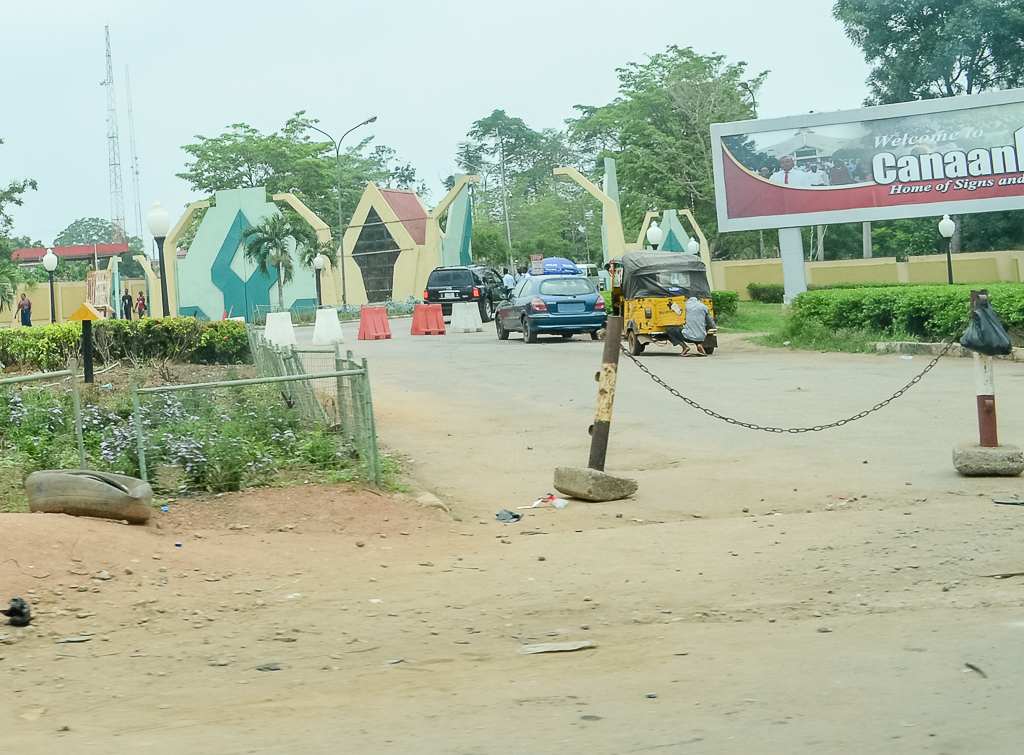
Living Faith Church entrance in Canaanland

As of 2014, the Church was in 65 countries.

=== Dominion Publishing House ===
The publishing house that grew out of Winner's Chapel was founded on 5 December 1992. Dominion Publishing House has published over 120 books, most of which have been written by Oyedepo.

== Beliefs ==
The Church is founded upon twelve core emphases called the 12-Pillars. The theological position of the church is Pentecostal.

The association has a charismatic confession of faith.

=== Education ===
Several educational institutions are linked to the chapel, including Covenant University, Landmark University, Faith Academy and over 150 Kingdom Heritage Model Schools. In addition, there is a ministry training college called The Word of Faith Bible Institute.

==== United Kingdom ====
In 2014, the church applied to open a Kingdom Heritage Model School in Kent. Concerns were raised by the National Secular Society about the church linking disobedience to witchcraft. The application was later withdrawn.

=== Shiloh ===
Every year in December, the church hosts a global event called Shiloh. The church says the mandate for this event is drawn from the Bible books of Joshua 18:1 and 1Samuel 1:3. The event is held mostly in the first week of December.

The church sees the purpose of the event as being to usher the visitation of God to his people. It also marks the end of the Church's calendar year.

As of 2012, there were millions in attendance. The Presiding Bishop also said up to 160 nations hooked up to Shiloh 2015, with nationals from 55 nations present at the Canaanland, Ota, Ogun State.

== See also ==
- Bible
- Born again
- Jesus Christ
- Believers' Church
