= Chiamaka Obuekwe =

Nigerian entrepreneur

- Education: Covenant University
- Occupations: Entrepreneur, CEO
- Known for: Promoting domestic tourism in Nigeria
- Title: CEO of Social Prefect Tours
- Awards: ELOY Award for Woman Who Inspires in Tourism (2017)

Chiamaka Obuekwe // is a Nigerian co-founder and CEO of Social Prefect Tours (which began in 2015 through her blog), an African tourism company which seeks to connect people across the continent through tour guides within Africa, school excursions, group tours and corporate retreats.

== Educational background ==
Obuekwe attended St.Gloria Primary School, Ikeja, and further attended Faith Academy, Ota, for her secondary education. She earned her bachelor's degree in International Relations at Covenant University, Ota.

== Career ==
Obuekwe worked at Jumia Nigeria as its Social Media and Publicist Specialist from November 2013 to October 2015. She worked with an e-commerce firm Mumsfave.com as the Social Media Manager from December 2015 and quit February 2016 to focus fully on Social Prefect Tours.

== Recognition ==
She was selected among the top 50 Nigerian Women celebrated by Maggi to celebrate its 50 years anniversary campaign. During the Eloy Awards 2017, she was given the Eloy Woman who inspires Award in Tourism. She was as well featured on CNN's Inside Africa.
