= Anny Robert =

Nigerian celebrity photographer (born 1990)

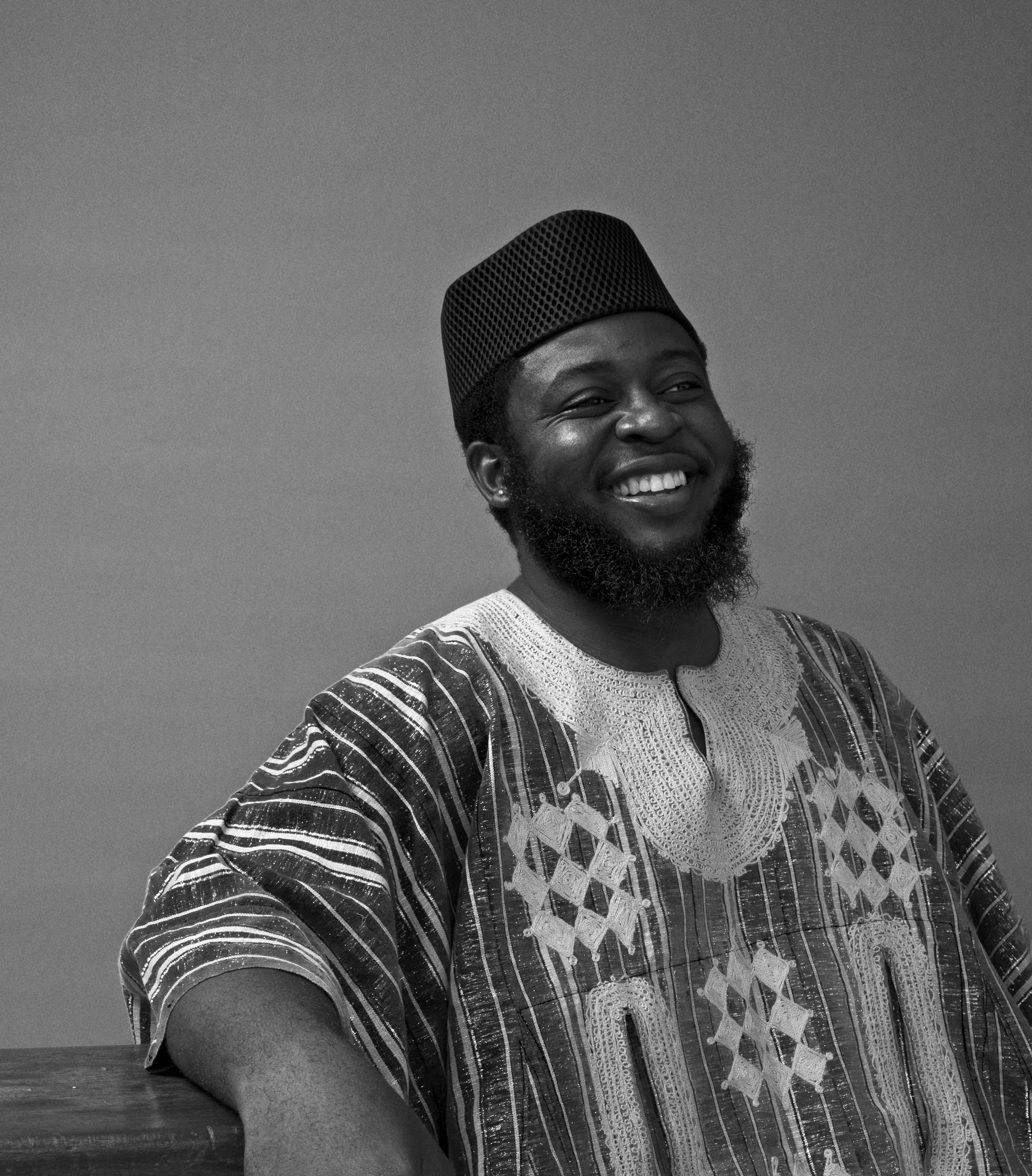
- Born: Anietie Robert; 28 October 1990 (age 35); Nigeria
- Education: Covenant University
- Occupations: Photographer, creative director, graphics artist
- Years active: 2014 – present
- Organization: Anny Robert
- Known for: Portrait, celebrity, and fashion photography
- Website: www.annyrobert.online

Anietie "Anny" Robert (born 28 October 1990) is a Nigerian portrait photographer and creative director based in Niger State, Nigeria.

== Education ==
Robert studied computer science at Covenant University.

== Career ==
Robert started his career in graphic artistry before transitioning to photography in 2014. His portfolio includes photographs of notable individuals such as Folorunsho Alakija, Burna Boy, Davido, Donald Duke, Tony Elumelu, Ice Prince, and WizKid. He co-owns StudioX, a photography studio, in partnership with Ari Labadi.

Robert's work as a photographer has gained recognition, with his name appearing on lists of top photographers in Nigeria and Africa. His work is characterized by its exploration of ideas and human realities.

In 2020, Robert served as a judge for OPPO Mobile's Redefinition Photography Contest, where he documented the lives of young Lagosians through his photography.

Additionally, Robert is recognized for his role in discovering and promoting the model Amaka.

=== Social activism ===
Robert has employed his photography for social activism purposes, including a photo session with breast cancer survivor Omolara Cookey as part of breast cancer awareness activities in 2017. In the same year, Robert released a series of images exploring the identity of modern women.

In 2019, he collaborated with MAJU, a female fashion brand in Nigeria, for the "I am Woman" session in celebration of Women's History Month. The session featured fashion model Aduke Bey and stylist Angel Obasi.

In 2020, Robert launched the "Women for Women" campaign, highlighting women activists in Nigeria.

=== Exhibits ===
In August 2020, Robert was one of several photographers featured in the digital exhibition "A Moment in History," presented by House of ZETA.

In December 2022, Robert participated in "The Ascension," an art show in Lagos curated by Áwurè.
