= Covenant University =

Christian University in Ota, Nigeria

Coordinates: 6.6699°N 3.1574°E

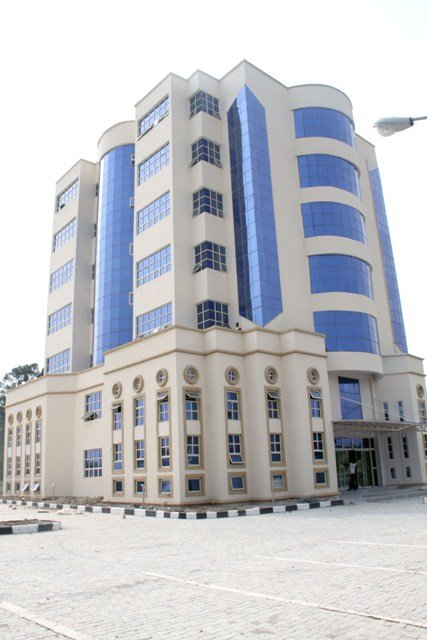
- Senate building
- Other name: CU
- Motto: Raising a New Generation of Leaders
- Type: Private
- Established: 21 October 2002
- Religious affiliation: Living Faith Church Worldwide
- Endowment: ₦265 million (2024)
- Chancellor: David Oyedepo
- Vice-Chancellor: Timothy Anake
- Registrar: Emmanuel Igban
- Location: Ota, Ogun State, Nigeria
- Campus: Urban
- Colours: Purple
- Website: covenantuniversity.edu.ng

Covenant University (CU) is a private Christian university in Sango Ota, Ogun State, Nigeria. It is affiliated with Living Faith Church Worldwide and is a member of the Association of Commonwealth Universities, Association of African Universities, and National Universities Commission.

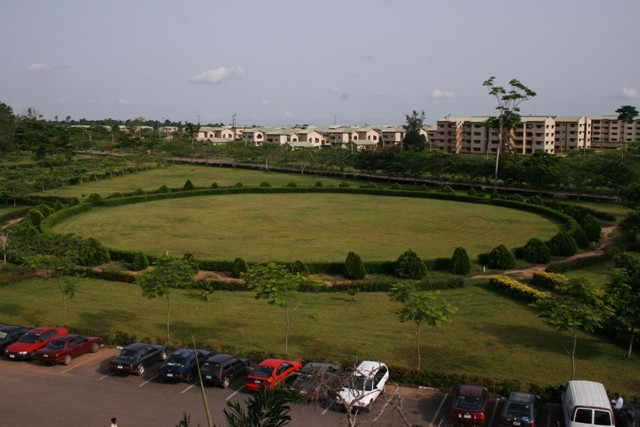
University campus

== History and governance ==
The process of founding Covenant University (CU) started in October 1999, one month after the dedication of the Faith Tabernacle in Ota. The university is a product of the Liberation Commission and was established by the World Mission Agency and the Living Faith Church Worldwide.

Covenant University opened on 21 October 2002 in Canaanland, Ota. It was founded by Bishop David Oyedepo, the presiding bishop of Living Faith Church Worldwide, who is chancellor of the university.

In 2019, Covenant University became the first Nigerian university to be ranked in the top 401-500 category of world universities by Times Higher Education.

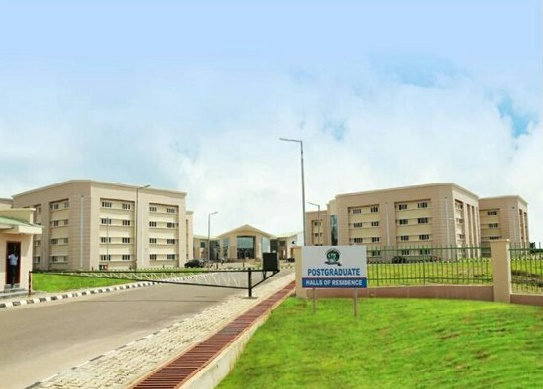
Postgraduate halls of residence

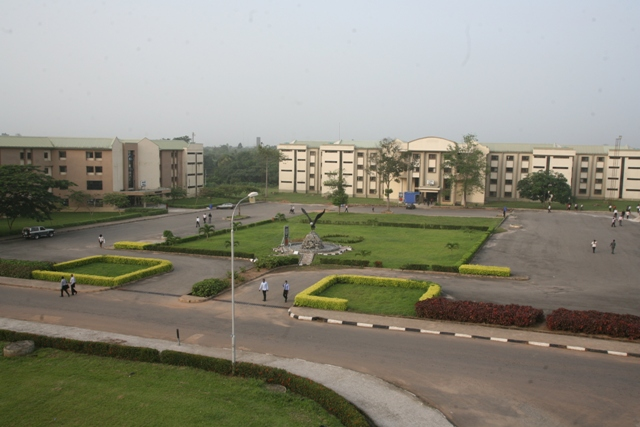
Female halls of residence

The university operates through colleges including the College of Engineering, College of Science and Technology, College of Management and Social Sciences, and College of Leadership and Development Studies.

== Secondary school ==
Covenant University Secondary School was established on October 14, 2010, to cater for the young population within the university environment.

== Notable alumni ==
- Baaj Adebule, actor, model and filmmaker
- Dolapo 'LowlaDee' Adeleke, filmmaker
- Bimbo Ademoye, actress
- Ayo Akínwándé, artist, curator and writer
- Teniola Aladese, actress, producer, and casting director
- Nonso Amadi, singer, songwriter and music producer
- Ayoola Ayolola, musician and actor
- Ishaya Bako, film director and screenwriter
- Nonso Bassey, singer, songwriter, actor and model
- Bez, multi-instrumentalist and composer
- Chike, singer
- Ini Dima-Okojie, actress and style icon
- Ife Durosinmi-Etti, business executive and author.
- Odunayo Eweniyi, business executive
- Ric Hassani, musician
- Emmanuel Iren, preacher and gospel songwriter.
- Chiamaka Obuekwe, businesswoman and tourism promoter
- Aiwanose Odafen, accountant and writer
- Adebukola Oladipupo, actor
- Charles Odii,Entrepreneur and Director General SMEDAN
- Gloria Oloruntobi, comedian
- Anny Robert, photographer
- Simi, lyricist and sound engineer
- Spellz, music producer (dropped out in his penultimate year)

== Notable faculty members ==
- Ezekiel Adebiyi, first professor of Bioinformatics in West Africa; vice-president (2007–2011) and secretary (2011–present) of African Society for Bioinformatics and Computational Biology
- Ekundayo Adeyinka Adeyemi, first professor of architecture in Nigeria and Sub-Saharan Africa
- Sheriff Folarin, former professor of International Relations
- Emmanuel Maduagwu, professor of Biochemistry and fellow of the Nigerian Academy of Science and Royal Society of Chemistry.
- Kayode Soremekun, former dean, College of Development Studies.

== Vice chancellors ==
- Bola Ayeni (May 2002 – September 2004)
- Jonathan Aremu (2005) (acting vice chancellor)
- Aize Obayan (February 2005 – October 31, 2012)
- Charles Ayo (November 1, 2012 – July 2016)
- AAA Atayero (July 15, 2016 – September 22, 2020)
- Akan Williams (September 22, 2020 – November 10, 2020) (acting vice chancellor)
- Abiodun Humphrey Adebayo (November 10, 2020 – November 30, 2024)
- Timothy Anake (December 1, 2024 – present)

== Recent developments and achievements ==
- On September 26, 2018, Covenant became the highest-ranked Nigerian university in the world universities ranking of the Times Higher Education (THE).
- In January 2015, it was ranked as the best university in Nigeria according to Webometrics. A publication by Vanguard, that segregated universities in Nigeria into Grade A, B, etc. based on JAMB score ceiling; categorized Covenant University as a "Grade A" university.
- The National Universities Commission in 2016, listed Covenant University as the best private school in Nigeria. In 2017, the university retained its position as Nigeria's best private institution according to the same government agency.
- Again, in August 2017, Lagos Chamber of Commerce and Industry awarded Covenant University with the best private university in Nigeria award. This feat was also achieved in 2013 and 2014.
- At the Presidential Special Scholarship Scheme for Innovation and Development (PRESSID), which is an annual initiative by the Federal government of Nigeria to provide scholarship abroad to students that graduated with first class degrees from Nigerian universities, Covenant University had the highest number of students that scaled through the aptitude examination among all universities in Nigeria during the 2013, 2014 and 2015 academic sessions.
- A 2017 collaborative study by Stutern, Jobberman and BudgIT reveal that graduates from Covenant University are the "most employable" in Nigeria. The study was criticized by some stakeholders for not having a large sample size.
- Techcabal rated Covenant University as having the best software developers in Nigeria. The school was also listed as having one of the best five postgraduate schools in Nigeria by Nigeria Bulletin. In January 2018, a Covenant University student, Ubani Peculiar Chinaemerem was awarded the best marketing student by the National Institute of Marketing of Nigeria among all students in Nigerian universities.
- In 2018, Covenant University won the Nigerian round of the CFA Institute Research Challenge, defeating the University of Lagos and Obafemi Awolowo University to become Nigeria's first representative in the global competition. In 2018, Federal Ministry of Science and Technology awarded the school first position in innovative technology among all universities in Nigeria. The school was placed third in the 2017 edition.

=== Students' organisation achievements ===
- Covenant was 2019 National Enactus Champion.
- Covenant Enactus took second position at the 2018 National Competition.
- In 2017, Covenant University Enactus team was second best nationwide.

== Criticisms ==
The university has received several criticisms and lawsuits in connection with its strict codes of conduct.

In June 2025, Covenant University drew public scrutiny following the death of Professor Joseph Olugbuyiro, a lecturer who had been previously dismissed by the institution. A report by Daily Trust stated that Olugbuyiro's death, attributed to cancer, occurred after he was allegedly denied his terminal benefits, which his family claimed led to financial hardship affecting his medical treatment. The university did not issue an official response to inquiries from Daily Trust regarding the allegations.
