= Ezekiel Adebiyi =

Nigerian bioinformatics professor and research scientist

Ezekiel Femi Adebiyi

Professor of Computer Science at Covenant University
- In office 2010–present

Personal details
- Born: 28 July 1970 (age 56) Ibadan, Oyo State
- Education: Ahmadu Bello University; University of Ilorin; University of Tübingen

Ezekiel Adebiyi is a Nigerian bioinformatics professor and research scientist. He was appointed president of Nigerian Society of Bioinformatics and Computational Biology. He was also appointed vice-president of African Society for Bioinformatics and Computational Biology. In 2010, he was made a professor at Covenant University, becoming the first bioinformatics professor in West Africa.

== Early life and education ==
Adebiyi was born on 28 July 1970 in Ibadan, Nigeria, although he is a native of Boluwaduro area of Osun State. He had his secondary school at United Community Secondary School, Ilorin. Between 1987 and 1991, he studied Mathematics at University of Ilorin graduating as the best graduating student. He also completed his master's degree from the same institution in 1995. His doctorate thesis was on Pattern Discovery in Biology and Strings Sorting: Theory and Experimentation, which he concluded in 2002 at University of Tübingen.

== Academic career and research interests ==
Adebiyi began his lecturing career immediately after graduation at University of Ilorin. In 2003, he withdrew from the school to become a visiting scientist at several research centers including San Diego Supercomputer Center, University of Montpellier and German Cancer Research Center. He continued with research before joining Covenant University Computer science department in 2008. He was appointed professor in 2010. He is also affiliated with the Division of Applied Bioinformatics at the German Cancer Research Center (DKFZ) in Heidelberg, where he had earlier worked as a visiting scientist.

Between 2007 and 2011, Adebiyi was the vice president of African Society for Bioinformatics and Computational Biology. After his tenure, he became the secretary of the professional body, and the president of Nigeria Society of Bioinformatics and Computational Biology (NISBCB). His research includes computational approaches to malaria, including identifying potential targets in the Anopheles gambiae mosquito for malaria vector control.
