= Chris Folayan =

American writer, lecturer, and businessman

- Born: Nigeria
- Education: San Jose State University
- Occupations: Writer, lecturer, businessman

Chris Folayan is an American writer, lecturer, and businessman.

== Early life and education ==
Folayan was born and raised in Nigeria. He later moved to California, United States, where he attended San Jose State University and graduated with a degree in marketing.

== Career ==
Folayan began his career in software development and initially worked for Quantum, a hard drive manufacturing company. While at Quantum, he worked on the development of numerous technical patents. Eventually, he left Quantum and co-founded NTM, a digital music platform that specialized in indie music recording-to-digital rights and sales.

After his time at NTM, Folayan established OCFX Inc. As its chief executive, he helped OCFX collaborate with SONY, Quantum, LSI Logic, Accenture, Adobe, Cisco, EMC, Merrill Lynch, Elo, CapitalOne, and many others. Subsequently, Folayan launched MallforAfrica, one of Africa's largest e-commerce platforms. The platform started from his garage and eventually grew into an international company. MallforAfrica partnered with U.S. retailers such as Barneys, Bloomingdale's, and Best Buy (BBY) and was affiliated with eBay and DHL.

Folayan has lectured at UC Berkeley Haas School of Business, San Jose State University, MIT, Stanford, UCLA, and London School of Business, as well as mentoring students at those universities. He has also given talks at the United Nations (UN), World Trade Organization (WTO), London Stock Exchange, GITEX Global, The Wall Street Journal conference, Bloomberg Global Business Forum (GEF), and the Dubai Chamber of Commerce Global Business Forum on Africa. In 2019, he was part of the inaugural Global Business Forum Mentorship Programme by the Dubai Chamber of Commerce.

Additionally, Folayan has given talks at the Wilson Center and World Affairs Council of Northern California. He is represented by All American Speakers (AAE), which has a roster that includes executives such as Bill Gates.

== Books and media ==
In late 2021, Folayan wrote From Pitch To Close, a finance book. In 2023, he received the 2023 Literary Titan Gold Book Award, as well as the 2023 Firebird Book Award. He has also written A Guide to Raising a CEO and Entrepreneur (2022) and the e-book series Investor Pitch Practice Questions.

Folayan has appeared in books such as The Next Africa (2015) by Jake Bright and Aubrey Hruby, and The New Leadership Literacies (2017) by Bob Johansen. He has also appeared in The New York Times, Bloomberg, CNBC, CGTN, USA Today, and TechCrunch.

In 2023, he launched a card game called Ready Set CEO.

== Memberships and affiliations ==
- San Jose State University (SJSU) – Innovation Advisory Council Member
- University of California, Riverside (UCR) – Design Thinking Advisory Board Member
