= Nigerian University of Technology and Management =

Private university in Lagos State, Nigeria

- Motto: In Africa, For Africa, and the World
- Type: Private
- Established: 2019
- President: Babs Omotowa
- Vice-Chancellor: Nubi Achebo (Acting)
- Location: Lagos State, Nigeria; 6°26′58″N 3°21′17″E
- Colors: Green and white
- Website: nutm.edu.ng

The Nigerian University of Technology and Management (NUTM) is a private university located in Lagos, Nigeria. Established in 2019, NUTM aims to provide education in Science, Technology, Engineering, Mathematics (STEM), and Management at the undergraduate, postgraduate, and doctoral levels.

== History ==
NUTM was founded in 2019 with the vision of developing innovative leaders in technology and management who will drive impact across Africa and globally. The university launched its first academic program, the NUTM Scholars Program (NSP), in 2020, a one-year interdisciplinary postgraduate program focused on Technology, Entrepreneurship, and Design. The program was discontinued in 2024.

Initially, the university operated from Landmark Boulevard, Lagos, before relocating to its temporary site in Apapa, Lagos. Plans are underway for the development of a permanent campus in Ogun State, Nigeria. Following its establishment, Nigerian engineer Aderemi Aaron-Anthony Atayero served as the pioneer Vice Chancellor of the university.

== Accreditation and academic programs ==
In 2023, the Nigerian University of Technology and Management (NUTM) received official accreditation from the National Universities Commission (NUC) to commence undergraduate and master's degree programs.

=== Undergraduate programs ===
NUTM offers a range of undergraduate degree programs focused on Science, Technology, Engineering, and Mathematics (STEM), including:

- Computer Science
- Cybersecurity
- Information Technology

The university held its inaugural undergraduate matriculation ceremony on January 11, 2025, at its temporary campus in Apapa, Lagos, marking the beginning of full academic activities. The first cohort of undergraduate students commenced studies in September 2024.

=== Master's degree programs ===
NUTM also offers postgraduate education, with master's degree programs designed to equip students with advanced technical and managerial skills. These include:

- Business Administration
- Data Science
- Software Engineering

=== Executive education programs ===
In addition to its degree programs, NUTM provides executive education courses tailored for professionals and industry leaders. These programs focus on emerging technologies and leadership development, including:

- Artificial Intelligence
- Business Analytics
- Design Thinking
- Leadership Excellence
