= Charles Ayo =

Nigerian academic (1958–2023)

Vice Chancellor, Covenant University
- In office 2012–2016
- Preceded by: Aize Obayan
- Succeeded by: AAA Atayero

Personal details
- Born: Charles Korede Ayo; 31 October 1958 Egbe, Kogi State, Federation of Nigeria
- Died: 2 August 2023 (aged 64)
- Education: Ahmadu Bello University; Obafemi Awolowo University; University of Ilorin

Charles Korede Ayo (31 October 1958 – 2 August 2023) was a Nigerian academic, administrator and vice-chancellor of the Covenant University. Prior to succeeding Aize Obayan as Vice Chancellor, he was the head of the Department of Computer and Information Sciences. He was also involved in research on computer and communications topics, such as electronic commerce and mobile computing. Ayo placed emphasis on leadership training at Covenant University, as well as on academic performance and "Godly standards." He sought to make Covenant University "one of the top 10 universities in the world" within a decade.

Ayo was the best graduating student in computer science at Ahmadu Bello University in 1984. He had a Ph.D. in Numerical Computation from the University of Ilorin. Prior to joining Covenant, he taught at Lagos State University. He was married with four children.

In 2017, Ayo delivered the keynote speech on Restructuring the higher education delivery for human capital development and national transformation at the convocation ceremony for Crawford University.

Charles Ayo died on 2 August 2023, at the age of 64.
