= Marenikae =

Nigerian singer

- Born: Morenike Mojisola Olayemi Enobong Lasode; March 11, 1993 (age 33); Nigeria
- Genres: Afrobeats; Alté
- Occupations: Singer; Songwriter
- Instrument: Vocals
- Years active: 2016–present

Morenike Mojisola Olayemi Enobong Lasode (born 11 March 1993) better known by her stage name Marenikae, is an Atlanta-based Nigerian singer-songwriter.

== Early life ==
Marenikae was born and raised in Nigeria to a Yoruba and Krio father who is a musician, film director and producer and an Efik mother. After her secondary education, she relocated to Boston for her tertiary education, where she earned a degree in criminology from the University of Massachusetts.

== Career ==
Marenikae started singing at the age of 14. She began her professional music career in 2018, with the release of her debut single "Remember". In 2018, Marenikae released her debut studio album Ajebutter.

In 2022, she released the music video for "Deliverance (na so)" the lead single off her EP "Acquired Taste". She also released "As I Be", as the second single off the EP.

== Discography ==
=== Albums ===
List of studio albums, with selected chart positions and certifications
Title	Album details
Ajebutter (Abridged & Remastered)	Released: 20 August 2020; Label: Formats: Digital download, streaming
Ajebutter	Released: 13 February 2018; Label: Formats: Digital download, streaming

=== Singles ===
List of singles as lead artist, with certifications and showing year released
Title	Year	Certifications
"Remember"	2017	
"Smooth Operator"	2017	
"Gidi"	2017	
"Feel Alive"	2019	
"Deliverance (na so)"	2022	
"As I Be"	2022	
