= International Association of Research Institutes in the History of Art =

The International Association of Research Institutes in the History of Art (RIHA) promotes education and research in art history and related disciplines. It was founded in 1998 in Paris to intensify cooperation between art historical institutes by facilitating the flow of information on scientific and administrative activities as well as the exchange of research findings, and to encourage the institutes to undertake joint projects.

The RIHA Journal is a peer-reviewed, open-access e-journal providing a publishing platform for international research articles in the history of art. It features art historical articles in English, French, German, Italian, and Spanish.
