= Abiodun Adebayo =

Nigerian academic

Abiodun H. Adebayo

Immediate Past Vice Chancellor
- Incumbent
- Assumed office November 10, 2020

Personal details
- Education: University of Calabar; University of Jos; Covenant University
- Awards: Post-Doctoral Research Fellowship award by Chinese Academy of Sciences and The Academy of Sciences for the Developing World (TWAS) tenable at the Key Laboratory of Pathogenic Microbiology and Immunology, Institute of Microbiology, Chinese Academy of Sciences, Beijing, China. 2012 – 2013; Post-Graduate Research Fellowship award by Chinese Academy of Sciences (CAS) and The Academy of Sciences for the Developing World (TWAS) tenable at the State Key Phytochemistry and Plant Resource Laboratory, Kunming Institute of Botany, CAS, China (March, 2008 – February, 2009); Travel Fellowship award by BioVision Alexandria, IDRC and TWAS to attend the International Scientific Workshop and Conference of BioVision Alexandria, Bibliotheca Alexandrina, Egypt April 9-16, 2010. 2011; Outstanding Lecturer Award in the Department of Biological Sciences by the College of Science and Technology, Covenant University 2010; Covenant University Award for High-Impact Journal Publication 2011-2012
- Website: https://staff.covenantuniversity.edu.ng/members/prof-adebayo-humphrey/

Abiodun Humphrey Adebayo is a Professor of Biochemistry and he was the immediate past vice-chancellor of Covenant University. He is also a member of the accreditation panel of National Universities Commission.

== Biography ==
Adebayo is an elected member of the governing board of the Association of African Universities (AAU). He was also elected into the governing council of the Association of Commonwealth Universities, where he serves as a council member and trustee. He is a Fellow of the Nigerian Young Academy and the Chartered Institute of Administration.

Adebayo obtained a B.Sc. (honours) degree in Biochemistry from the University of Calabar in 2000. He later proceeded to the University of Jos in 2003 and was awarded an M.Sc. degree in Biochemistry in 2005. Adebayo was awarded a PhD degree in Biochemistry by Covenant University, Ota, Nigeria in 2009. He undertook a Postdoctoral study at the Institute of Microbiology, Chinese Academy of Sciences in 2012-2013.

He specialized in Plant Biochemistry and has been actively involved in the sustainable use of indigenous medicinal plants. His main research focus is on phytochemical, biochemical and toxicity studies of medicinal plants. His research on medicinal plants involves the purification, isolation and characterization of active compounds from plants; these compounds are in turn screened for anticancer, antiviral, antimicrobial and antioxidant properties. Professor Adebayo is also involved in the safety evaluation of locally used medicinal plants using biochemical, haematological and histopathological indices of toxicity.

Adebayo, who is a recipient of the prestigious Chinese Academy of Sciences (CAS) and the Academy of Sciences for the Developing World (TWAS) Fellowship awards, has published in reputable local and international journals. His astuteness has earned him three times prize of Covenant University High Impact Journal publication awards for the years 2010, 2011 and 2012. He won a research equipment grant from the Ministry of Science and Technology, China. His research group won the TWAS research grant for carrying out a study on the "Preclinical evaluation of novel computational-aided designed compounds as antimalarial drug candidates". The fund also made provision for the award of scholarship for MSc students. Adebayo reviews some high-impact journals. He is also listed on the editorial board of some international journals.

Adebayo’s biography was listed and published in the 30th edition of Marquis Who’s Who in the World in the United States. Adebayo, who was the chairman of the Covenant University Farm Board and Drug Procurement Committee and a professor in the Department of Biochemistry, is a former Dean of the school of Postgraduate Studies, Covenant University, Ota, Ogun State, Nigeria.

Source: https://staff.covenantuniversity.edu.ng/members/prof-adebayo-humphrey/
