= Tomáš Hrubý =

Czech cyclist

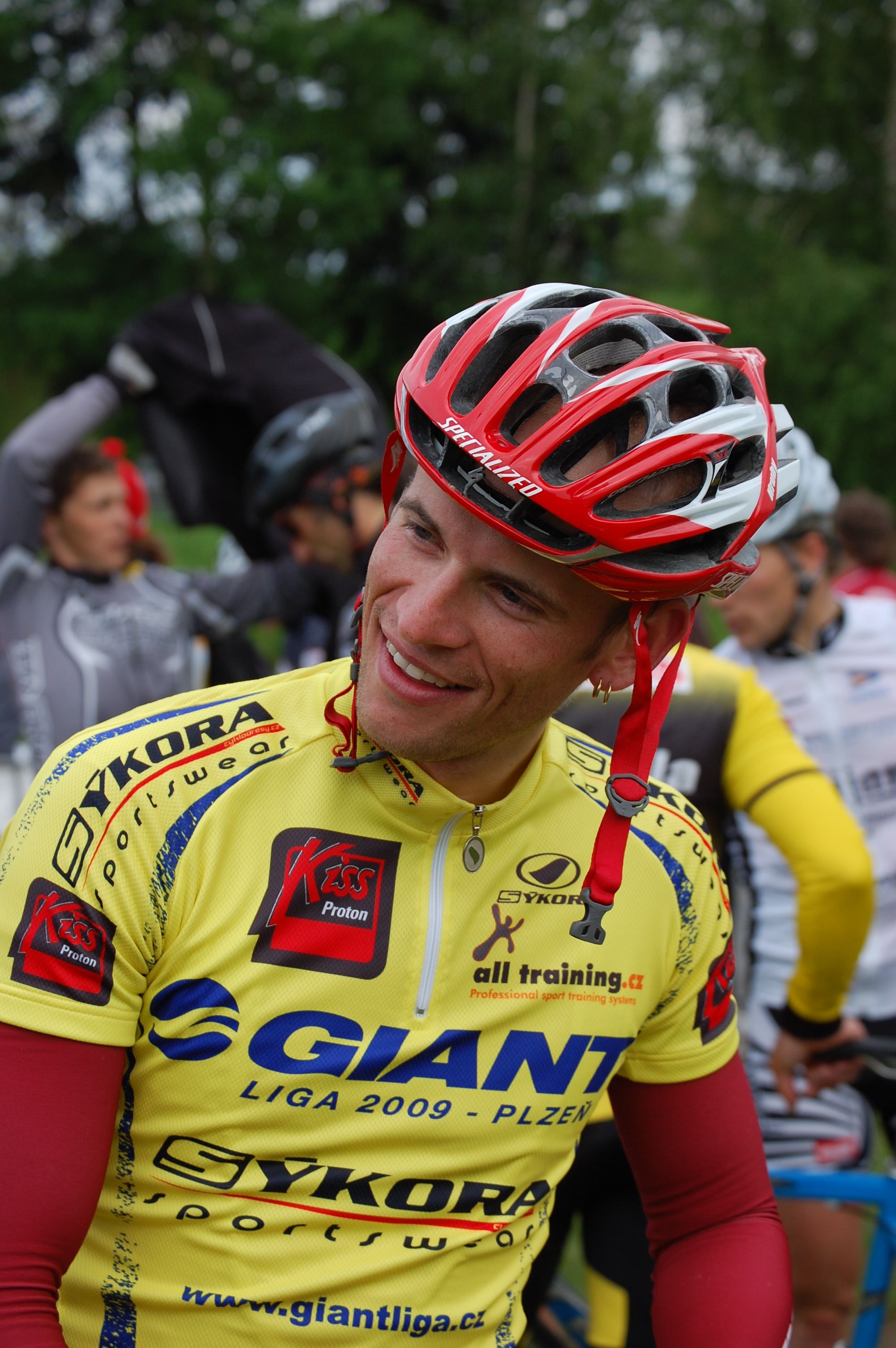

Personal information
- Born: 7 June 1982 (age 44) Vrchlabí, Czech Republic

Cycling career
- Sport: Cycling
- Current team: Retired
- Discipline: Road
- Role: Rider

Professional team
- 2006–2011: AC Sparta Praha

Tomáš Hrubý (born 7 June 1982 in Vrchlabí) is a Czech former professional road cyclist.
