= Morẹ́nikẹ́ Ọláòṣebìkan =

Pharmaceutical manufacturing inventor

- Born: Morẹ́nikẹ́ Ẹniọlá Ọláòṣebìkan; Ikeja, Lagos, Nigeria
- Citizenship: Nigeria (1983-present); Canada (2013-present)
- Education: University of Alberta
- Occupations: Pharmaceutical manufacturing inventor, Licensed clinical pharmacist, Public health advocate, University of Alberta adjunct professor
- Years active: 23
- Website: morenike.co

Morẹ́nikẹ́ Ẹniọlá Ọláòṣebìkan is a Nigerian-Canadian pharmaceutical manufacturing inventor, licensed clinical pharmacist and public health advocate. She is CEO of Kemet Group, which is developing Kemplex, a modular, on-demand essential medicines manufacturing system to address real-time drug shortages in low resource settings. Morenike initiated the Ribbon Rouge Foundation in 2006.

== Career ==
Ọláòṣebìkan founded the Ribbon Rouge Foundation in 2006 and was its President & Executive Director from 2013 to 2020. She helped grow membership from 13 volunteers to 180 volunteers and raised $1.1M for the Foundation in 2020. The Foundation is a nonprofit corporation under the Societies Act that focuses on health equity and facilitates social justice through the Arts. Serving African, Caribbean and Black people in Alberta, Canada, the Foundation facilitates systems change in the structural and social factors that lead to poorer health outcomes. The Foundation received a ScotiaBank Home-Game Changer award in 2014 and received the Canadian Pharmacists Association Patient Care Achievement Award for Health Promotion in 2017.

Ọláòṣebìkan founded Kemet Group in 2016. Kemet is developing a scalable Industry 4.0 system that can produce medications in small or large volumes, with the flexibility to supply custom-made medications. The components of Kemet’s system can be set up anywhere in the world to produce generic drugs, supplying just-in-time medications to address critical global shortages.

Since 2015, Ọláòṣebìkan has been an organizational member of the Canadian HIV/AIDS Black, African and Caribbean Network, a national network of organizations, individuals and other stakeholders who are dedicated to responding to issues related to HIV in Canada’s African, Caribbean and Black communities.

Since 2016, she has been a University of Alberta Clinical Academic Colleague, serving as a volunteer educator, preceptor and mentor to students at the faculty and foreign exchange students.

== Recognition ==
- Ọláòṣebìkan was the University of Alberta’s Preceptor of the Year in 2015.
- In 2017, she received Avenue Magazine Edmonton's 40 under 40 Award
- Campus Alberta's Health Outcomes & Public Health Award
- Canadian Public Health Association’s Patient Care Achievement Award for Health Promotion
- Recognized by Canadian Parliament with a Canada 150 Pin.
