= Ekundayo Adeyinka Adeyemi =

Nigerian architect (1937–2022)

Ekundayo Adeyemi

Distinguished Professor of Architecture, Covenant University
- In office 2004–2022

Acting Vice Chancellor of the Federal University of Technology Akure
- In office December 1999 – September 2001
- Preceded by: Lawrence Babatope Kolawole
- Succeeded by: Robert Adebowale Ogunsusi (acting)

Personal details
- Born: Adeyemi Adeyinka Ekundayo; 27 February 1937 Nigeria
- Died: 25 January 2022 (aged 84)
- Education: Ahmadu Bello University (Bachelor of Architecture); Columbia University (Master of Science in Architecture); New York University (Master of Urban Planning); New York University (Doctor of Philosophy in Architecture)
- Known for: Being the first architecture professor in Nigeria and Sub-Saharan Africa

Ekundayo Adeyinka Adeyemi (27 February 1937 – 25 January 2022) was a Nigerian architect and academic who was a distinguished professor of architecture at Covenant University, Ota. In 1975, Adeyemi attained professorship at Ahmadu Bello University, Zaria a promotion that made him the first professor of architecture in Nigeria and Sub-Saharan Africa. He was acting vice chancellor of the Federal University of Technology Akure from December 1999 to September 2001.

== Early life and education ==
Born to parents from Ekiti State, Adeyemi attended four different primary schools across various states before concluding his basic education in Ekiti State. His secondary education was completed at Christ's School Ado Ekiti, the state capital in 1956. In 1963, he obtained a degree in architecture from Ahmadu Bello University. In 1965, he got his master's degree from Columbia University. This was followed by another master's in urban planning from New York University in 1973. His PhD thesis was on Kaduna Capital Territory and Metropolitan Lagos: An Analysis of Administrative and Institutional Framework for Urban land Planning and Development and was completed in the same institution by 1974.

== Career ==
Adeyemi is regarded as the first professor of architecture of Nigeria, he is also reported as being the 1st academic to attain professorship in architecture in Sub-Saharan Africa.

=== Academic and administrative positions ===
Ekundayo was a member of several professional bodies including Nigerian Institute of Architects, African Union of Architects and American Institute of Planners. Ekundayo started his lecturing career at Ahmadu Bello University in 1969, where he rose through the ranks to become the dean of faculty of environmental design in 1976. He was made a professor at the university the previous year. In 1982, Ekundayo went on sabbatical to University of Sheffield as a visiting professor. In 1988, Ekundayo was appointed Deputy Vice Chancellor of Federal University of Technology Akure. Between 1999 and 2002, he was selected as Ag. Vice Chancellor of the school. In 2004, he came out of retirement to become the dean of College of Science and Technology and distinguished professor in Covenant University. He was also regarded as a father to many people, And he helped set up Architecture departments in a few universities in Nigeria.

=== Publications ===
In a 2008 study titled Meaning and Relevance in Nigerian Traditional Architecture: The Dialectics of growth and Change, Adeyemi attempted to correct the misconception that Africans dwelled in "unstructured, isolated bush communities with little appreciation of the aesthetics in town design" by providing understandings on what shaped the ancient traditional architectures of buildings across the main ethnic groups in Nigeria, while providing insight and an holistic view on African buildings of old.

A 2014 paper titled Characteristics of Early Ecclesiastical Architecture in Lagos State in Nigeria by Adeyemi in Journal for Cultural and Design Studies noted that the period between early 1850s till the late 1920s started a major structural era in the kind of buildings designed in Nigeria. The study analyzed the five most important Christian facilities that were built during the period, while taking into consideration their distinctive properties. The findings from the publication were that the buildings were designed with minimal inputs, ideas and comments from nationals and the mechanism employed has changed over the years from what is being used today.

== Death ==
Adeyemi died on 25 January 2022, at the age of 84.
