= Nike Folayan =

British academic

- Born: 1978 (age 47–48)
- Education: University of Kent University of Sheffield
- Employer: WSP UK
- Known for: Association for Black and Minority Ethnic Engineers (AFBE-UK)

Dr Nike Folayan MBE HonFREng (born 1978) is a Chartered Engineer and a Telecommunications Engineering Consultant. She is co-founder and chair of the Association for Black and Minority Ethnic Engineers that campaigns for more ethnic diversity in UK engineering.

== Education and career ==
Folayan received an MEng in electronic engineering from the University of Kent, and earned her PhD in antenna design at the University of Sheffield.

After her PhD, Folayan joined Mott MacDonald as a Communications Engineer. Here she "worked on the radio design for a number of tunnels as well as communications systems such as CCTV and public address systems". She joined Parsons Brinckerhoff in 2013, working as a Systems Integration Consultant. She worked on major infrastructure projects including CrossRail and the upgrade of Victoria Station. In 2016 she was promoted to Associate Director for Communications and Control within the Railways Division of WSP.

== Campaign for diversity ==
In 2008, Folayan won the Precious Award for "Inspiring Leader within the Workplace". In 2012, Dr Folayan was featured in Powerlist: Britain’s 100 most influential people of African and Caribbean heritage. She was the keynote speaker at the Higher Education Academy STEM annual conference in 2014. She is a trustee at the Engineering Development Trust and a member of the Science Council and Transport for London diversity groups. She contributed to the Royal Academy of Engineer's diversity strategy, In 2017, Folayan spoke at the Institution of Engineering and Technology's "9 % is Not Enough" conference.

== The Association for Black and Minority Ethnic Engineers ==
Nike Folayan and her brother Ollie Folayan founded the Association for Black and Minority Ethnic Engineers (AFBE-UK) in 2007 and remain as the organisation's chairperson. In 2011 Vince Cable, then Secretary of State for Business, Innovation and Skills attended the AFBE-UK’s seminar on infrastructure in the UK. At the time, he recognised AFBE-UK as "an excellent example of encouraging partnership between stakeholders in the engineering communities and supporting young people as they embark on a range of exciting career paths in science and technology". In 2012 AFBE-UK launched "Making Engineering Hot", a video campaign which promotes engineering to the BME community. In 2016 she coordinated "Transition", which saw students from universities across London take part in a series of employability workshops, CV assessments, mock interviews and engineering challenges.
