= Hrubčice =

- Municipality
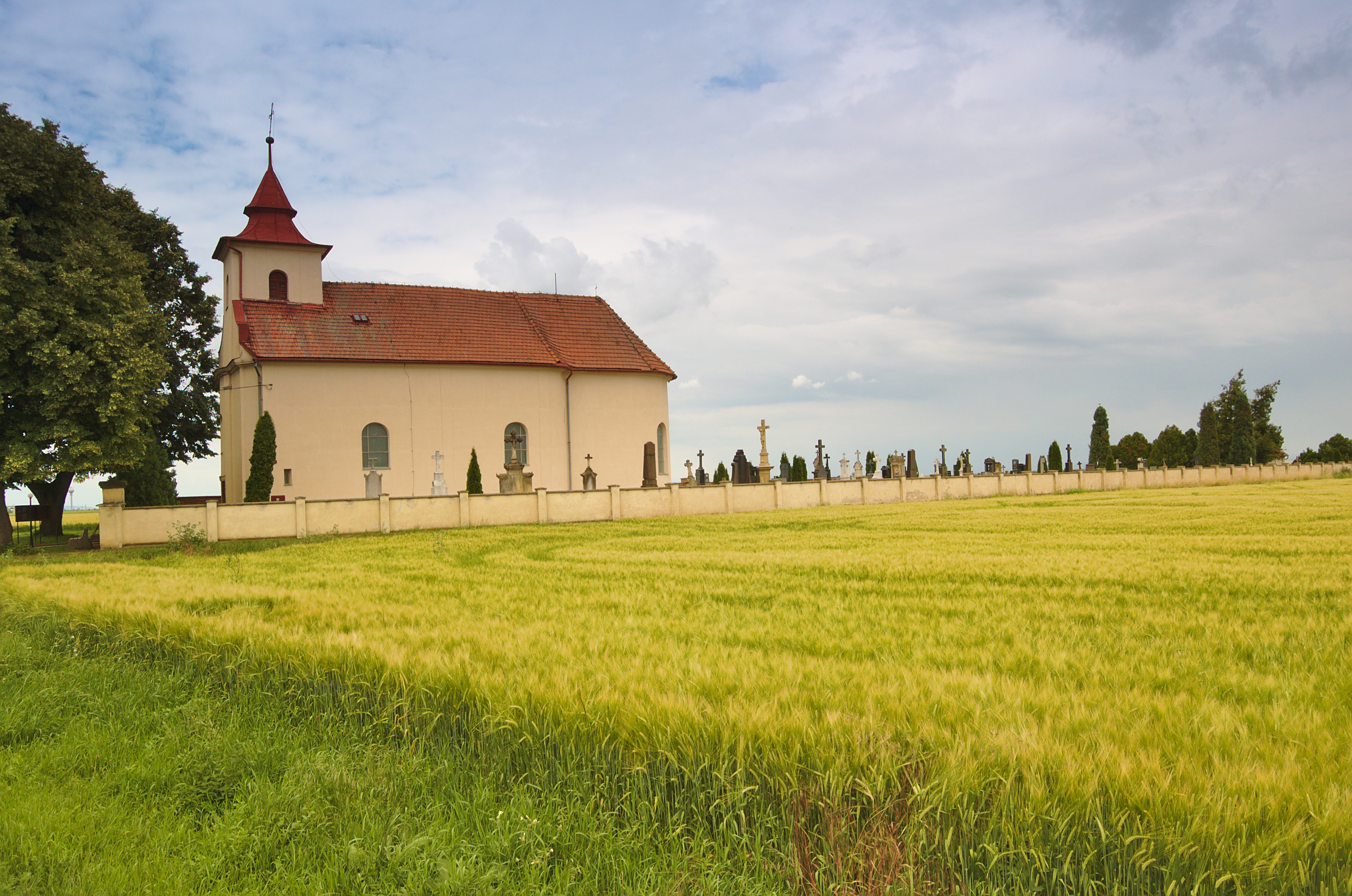
- Church of Saint Urban

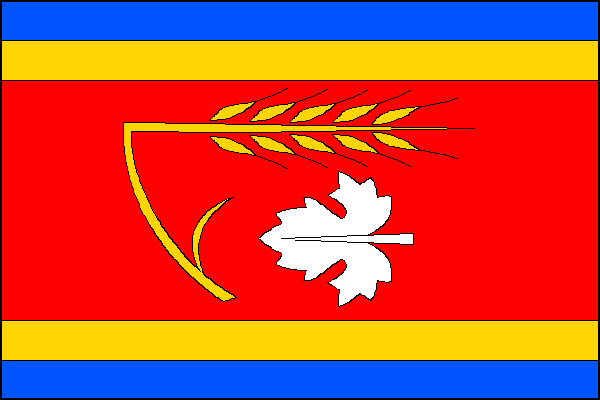
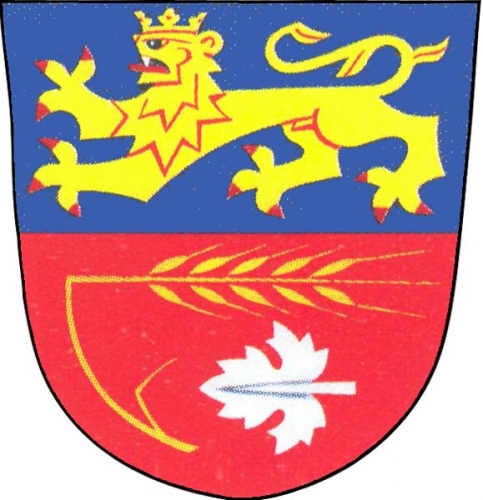
- Flag Coat of arms

- Location in the Czech Republic
- Coordinates: 49°27′0″N 17°11′35″E
- Country: Czech Republic
- Region: Olomouc
- District: Prostějov
- First mentioned: 1368

Area
  - Total: 8.33 km^{2} (3.22 sq mi)
- Elevation: 210 m (690 ft)

Population (2026-01-01)
  - Total: 873
  - Density: 105/km^{2} (271/sq mi)
- Time zone: UTC+1 (CET)
  - Summer (DST): UTC+2 (CEST)
- Postal code: 798 21
- Website: www.hrubcice.cz

Hrubčice is a municipality and village in Prostějov District in the Olomouc Region of the Czech Republic. It has about 900 inhabitants.

Hrubčice lies approximately 8 km (5 mi) east of Prostějov, 17 km (11 mi) south of Olomouc, and 213 km (132 mi) east of Prague.

== Administrative division ==
Hrubčice consists of two municipal parts (in brackets population according to the 2021 census):

- Hrubčice (691)
- Otonovice (90)

== History ==
The first written mention of Hrubčice is from 1368.

== Demographics ==
Historical population
Year	Pop.	±%
1869	676	—
1880	707	+4.6%
1890	819	+15.8%
1900	895	+9.3%
1910	979	+9.4%
1921	1,063	+8.6%
1930	1,045	−1.7%
1950	986	−5.6%
1961	1,044	+5.9%
1970	964	−7.7%
1980	950	−1.5%
1991	826	−13.1%
2001	789	−4.5%
2011	783	−0.8%
2021	781	−0.3%
Source: Censuses
