= Joseph Afolayan =

Nigerian professor of civil engineering

Vice chancellor of Anchor University
- In office 2017–2022

Personal details
- Citizenship: Nigeria
- Education: Ahmadu Bello University
- Occupation: Professor of civil engineering (structural risk analysis)
- Known for: Civil Engineering

Academic background
- Thesis: Reliability-Based Design Rules for Thin-Walled Structural Steel Beam-Column Elements

Joseph Afolayan is a Nigerian professor of civil engineering (structural risk analysis). He is the former acting vice chancellor of Landmark University and the current vice chancellor of Anchor University Lagos.

== Education ==
Joseph Afolayan started his career at the Ahmadu Bello University (ABU), Zaria, where he received a B. Eng in civil engineering in 1981. He had his M. Eng and PhD in structural engineering from ABU in 1984 and 1994 respectively and became a professor in 2004. Apart from ABU, Afolayan has also attended a couple of other foreign institutions, learning skills as an educator, researcher and an administrator.

== Professional and administrative career ==
He joined the Civil Engineering Department of the Federal University of Technology Akure (FUTA) in 2005 and Landmark University in 2014, from where he joined Anchor University as the vice chancellor. At FUTA, he was a HOD and the dean of the School of Engineering and Engineering Technology. More recently, Afolayan was the acting vice chancellor of Winners Chapel's own university, Landmark University, Omu-Aran, Kwara State, Nigeria. The present and pioneer vice chancellor of AUL became a professor in 2004 at the Ahmadu Bello University, Zaria. It is on record that Afolayan had undertaken more high-profile publications and researches after he became a professor than when he was not.

As an educator and university administrator, Afolayan specialises in risk analysis and strategies for management of engineering systems; numerical modelling with computer applications in structural engineering; and the use of innovative materials in the building industry. He has also supervised research works at different levels of the university for over 30 years.

== Honours and recognitions ==
Afolayan has undertaken academic exchanges as a scholar across universities in Germany. He is a member of the Council for the Regulation of Engineering in Nigeria (COREN), Nigerian Society of Engineers (NSE), New York Academy of Sciences, the American Society of Civil Engineers (ASCE) and the Structural Stability Research Council (SSRC), the United States among many other international professional organisations.
