= Morenike Oluwatoyin Folayan =

Nigerian medical scientist

- Born: 2 January 1967 (age 59)
- Occupation: Medical scientist
- Awards: Fellow of the Nigerian Academy of Science (2023)

Academic background
- Education: Obafemi Awolowo University; University of Nicosia

Academic work
- Discipline: Public health
- Sub-discipline: Adolescent health; HIV/AIDS research; paediatric dentistry
- Institutions: Obafemi Awolowo University

Morenike Oluwatoyin Folayan Ukpong (born 2 January 1967) is a Nigerian medical scientist who specialises in adolescent health, HIV/AIDS research, and paediatric dentistry. She is Professor of Paediatric Dentistry at Obafemi Awolowo University (OAU), where she has worked since 2002.

== Biography ==
Morenike Oluwatoyin Folayan was born on 2 January 1967 and was educated at Obafemi Awolowo University, where she got her BChD in 1989 and her MBA in 1998. She became Fellow of the West African College of Surgeons in 2001, and she became part of the Obafemi Awolowo University academic staff in 2002. Initially ranked at Lecturer 1, she was promoted to Senior Lecturer in 2005, to Reader in 2008, and eventually Professor of Paediatric Dentistry. She received her MEd from the University of Nicosia in 2020. She also works at the Obafemi Awolowo University Teaching Hospital as a clinician and at the College of Health Sciences as Deputy Director of Research & Partnership Advancement.

As an academic, Folayan specialises in adolescent health, HIV/AIDS research, and paediatric dentistry. She also successfully advocated for the mandatory inclusion of adolescent clinics in HIV/AIDS treatment facilities in Nigeria and several national policies concerning HIV/AIDS in adolescents. She has also done epidemiological research on early childhood tooth decay. She has also worked as an advisor or consultant with several United Nations agencies - particularly the Joint United Nations Programme on HIV/AIDS, UNICEF, and the World Health Organization - and with other NGOs like the Population Council and the Society for Family Health Nigeria.

Folayan was elected Fellow of the Nigerian Academy of Science in 2023.
