= Aubrey Hruby =

American investor

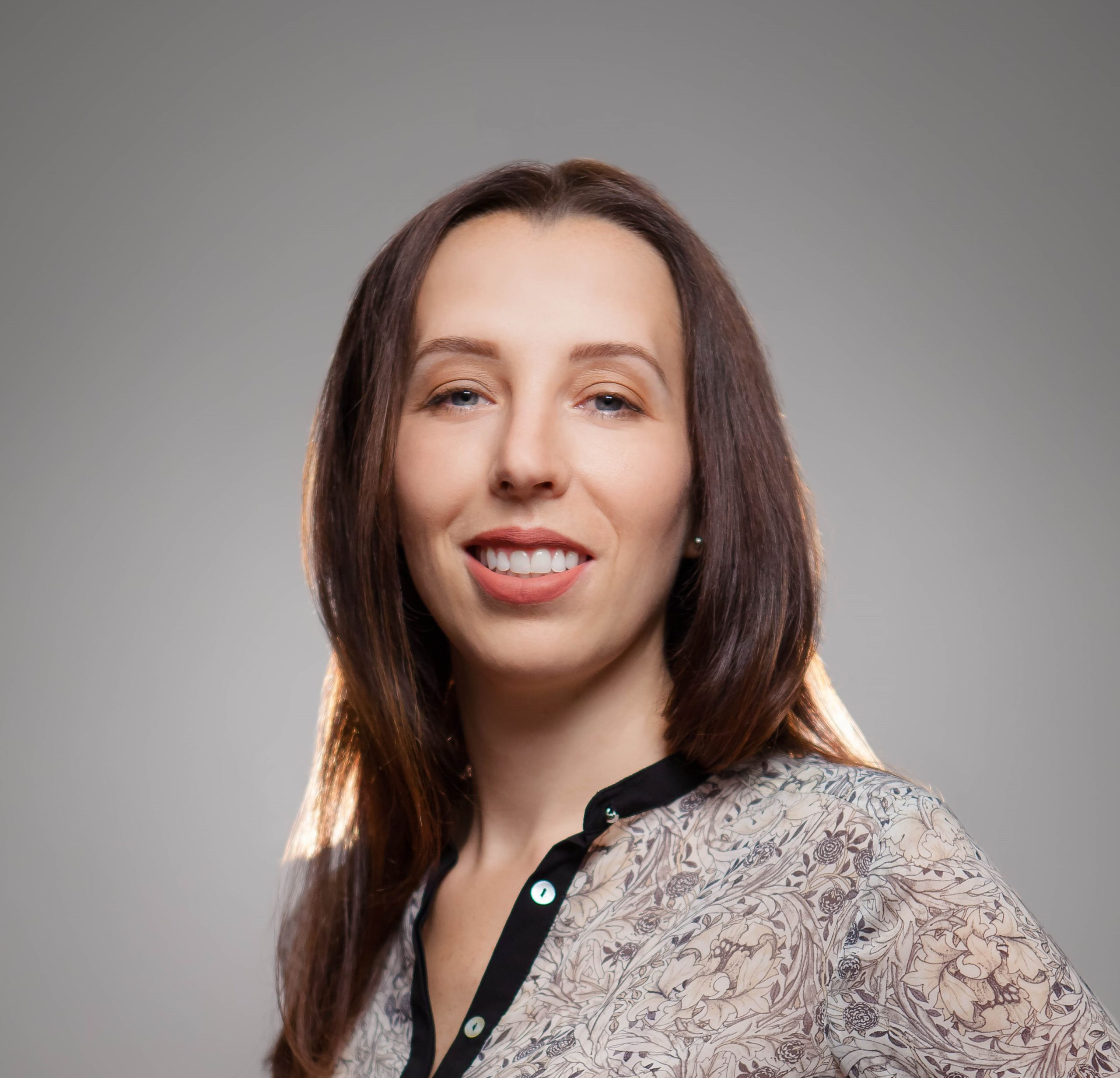
- Hruby in 2019
- Education: Georgetown University
- Organization: Atlantic Council
- Website: Aubreyhruby.com

Aubrey Hruby is an American writer, investor, and co-founder of InsiderPR and Africa Expert Network, and she speaks and writes regularly on African business issues in media. As a Senior Fellow at the Africa Center, Atlantic Council, she has worked with government agencies and policy-makers on business and is an advisor on Africa-focused investments.

Hruby earned an MBA from the Wharton School at the University of Pennsylvania and an MA from Georgetown University, where she currently teaches. She is the co-author of the award-winning book The Next Africa (Macmillan, 2015), a term member of the Council on Foreign Relations, and Young Leader at the Milken Institute.

In 2018, Hruby co-founded Tofino Capital, a venture capital firm that targets early-stage startups in emerging markets.
