= Hrubý Jeseník (Nymburk District) =

- Municipality
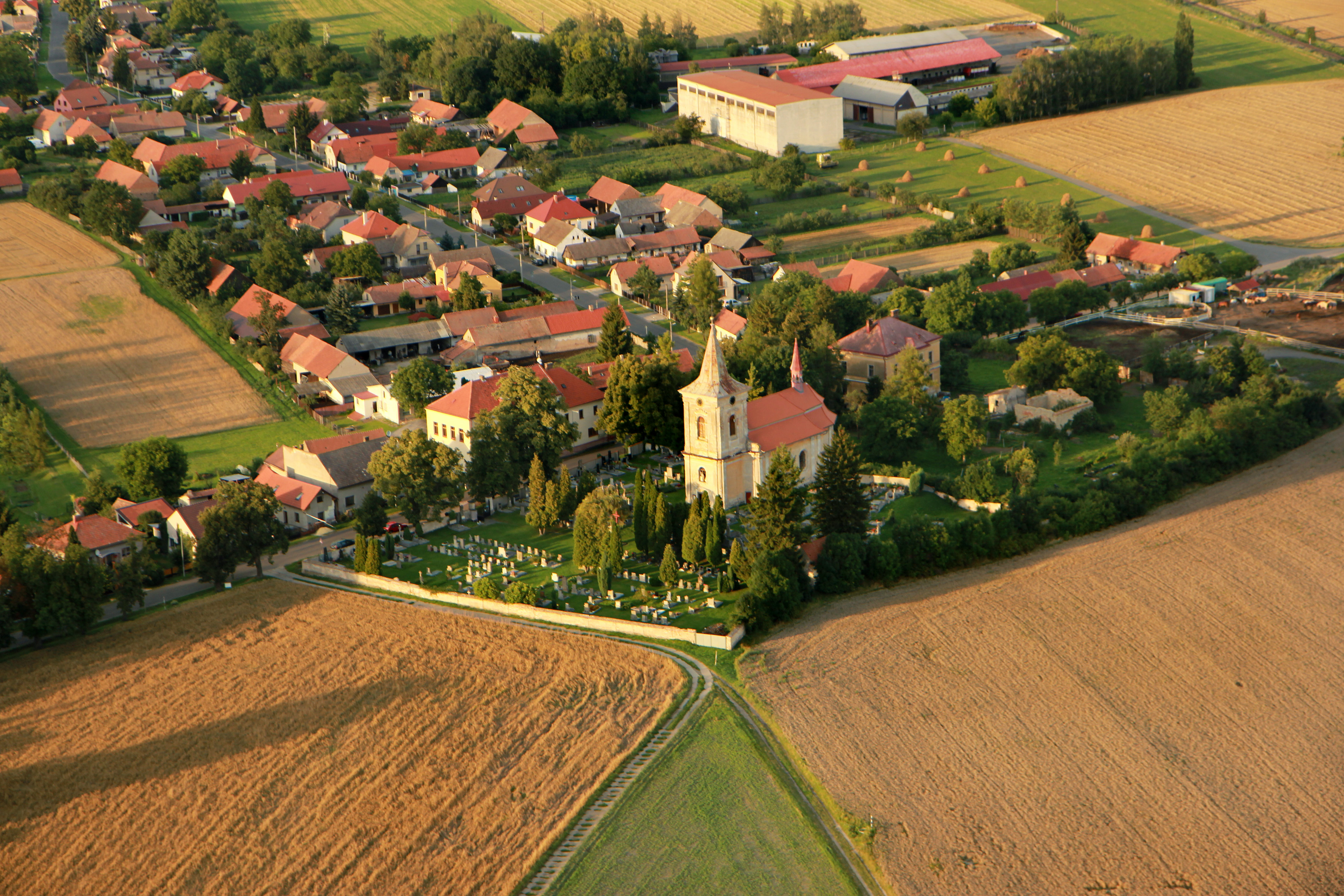
- Aerial view

- Flag Coat of arms

- Location in the Czech Republic
- Coordinates: 50°15′4″N 15°5′39″E
- Country: Czech Republic
- Region: Central Bohemian
- District: Nymburk
- First mentioned: 1088

Area
  - Total: 6.49 km^{2} (2.51 sq mi)
- Elevation: 195 m (640 ft)

Population (2026-01-01)
  - Total: 605
  - Density: 93.2/km^{2} (241/sq mi)
- Time zone: UTC+1 (CET)
  - Summer (DST): UTC+2 (CEST)
- Postal code: 289 32
- Website: www.hruby-jesenik.cz

Hrubý Jeseník is a municipality and village in Nymburk District in the Central Bohemian Region of the Czech Republic. It has about 600 inhabitants.

== Etymology ==
The name Jeseník is derived from the Czech adjective jesenný (from jasan, i.e. 'ash') and referred to a hill covered with an ash forest. The prefix hrubý means 'rough'.

== Geography ==
Hrubý Jeseník is located about 8 kilometres (5 mi) northeast of Nymburk and 43 km (27 mi) northeast of Prague. It lies in a flat agricultural landscape in the Central Elbe Table.

== History ==
The first written mention of Hrubý Jeseník is from 1088, when King Vratislaus II donated the village to the Vyšehrad Chapter. Until the 16th century, Hrubý Jeseník was owned by various less important noblemen. In the 16th century, the village was acquired by the Křinecký of Ronov family, who joined it to the Křinec estate. During the Thirty Years' War, the village was almost completely destroyed. At the end of the 17th century, the estate was bought by the Morzin family.

== Demographics ==
Historical population

Year	Pop.	±%
1869	831	—
1880	900	+8.3%
1890	890	−1.1%
1900	805	−9.6%
1910	832	+3.4%

Year	Pop.	±%
1921	805	−3.2%
1930	770	−4.3%
1950	599	−22.2%
1961	575	−4.0%
1970	524	−8.9%

Year	Pop.	±%
1980	515	−1.7%
1991	497	−3.5%
2001	512	+3.0%
2011	531	+3.7%
2021	578	+8.9%

Source: Censuses

== Transport ==
The railway line Jičín–Nymburk passes through the municipality, but there is no train station.

== Sights ==
The main landmark of Hrubý Jeseník is the Church of Saint Wenceslaus. It was built in the late Baroque style in 1766.
