= Canaanland =

Megachurch complex in Ogun State, Nigeria

Canaanland is an evangelical megachurch in Ota, Ogun State, Nigeria, and headquarters of Winners' Chapel.

The 560-acre (2.3 km^{2}) facility opened in 1999, and has since expanded to almost 5,000 acres (20 km^{2}) or 2000 hectares. It includes the headquarters of Winners' Chapel, the church building itself known as Faith Tabernacle, Covenant University, Faith Academy Secondary School, and Kingdom Heritage Nursery/Primary School. Several business ventures operated by the church are located within the Canaanland complex, including Dominion Publishing House, Hebron Bottled Water Processing Plant, a bakery, various restaurants and stores, four banks, and several residential estates that provide for the over 2,000 church employees and 9,000 students that live there. The 50,000 capacity Faith Tabernacle which was built within 10 months in 1999 is the world's largest church building.
