= Jonesborough Historic District =

Historic district in Tennessee, United States

- U.S. National Register of Historic Places
- U.S. Historic district
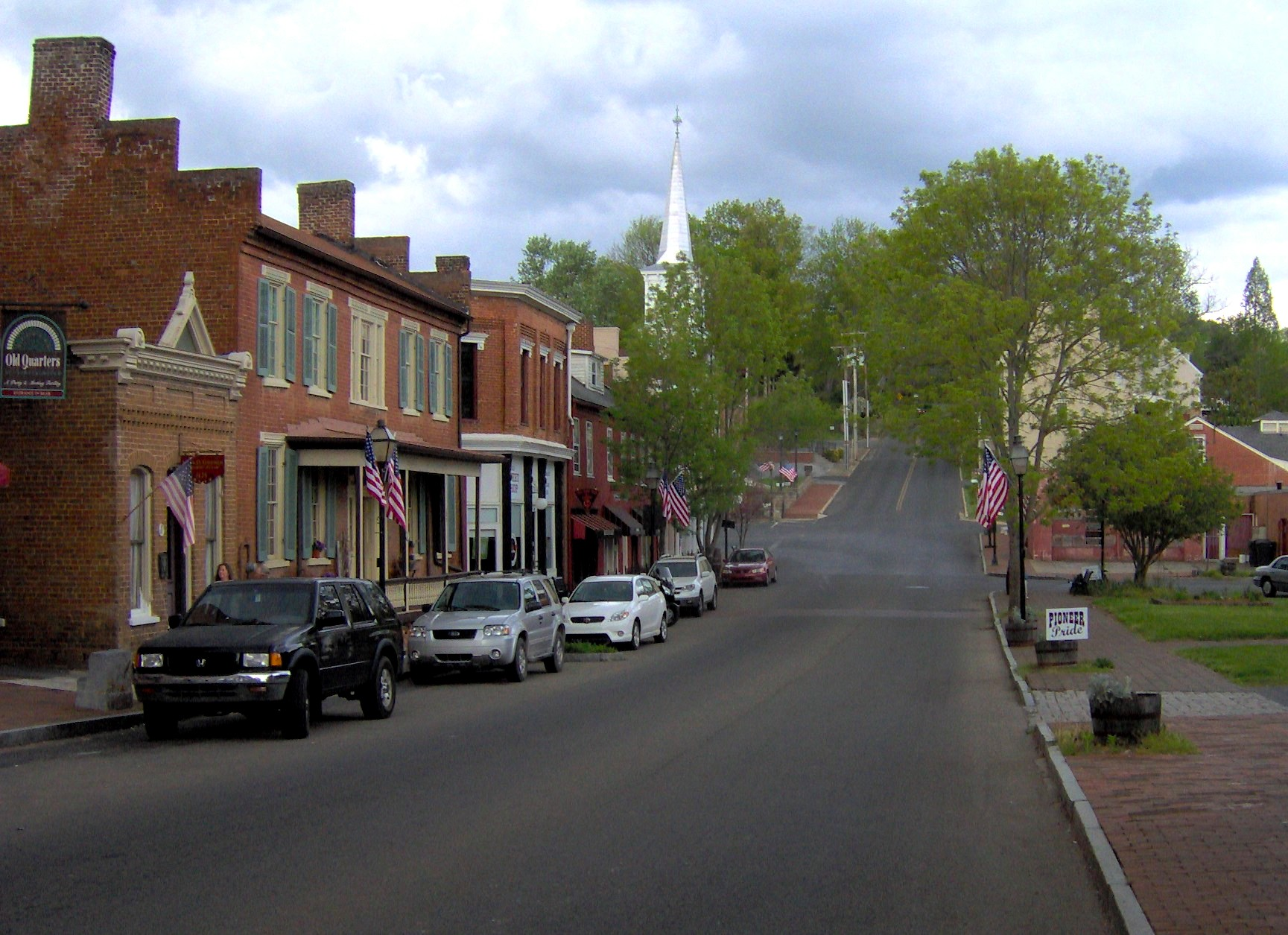
- Main Street, part of the Jonesborough Historic District

- Location within Tennessee Location within the United States
- Location: Jonesborough, Tennessee
- Coordinates: 36°17′35″N 82°28′24″W
- Area: 120 acres (49 ha)
- Architectural style: Queen Anne, Greek Revival, Federal
- NRHP reference No.: 69000183 (original); 100004686 (increase)

Significant dates
- Added to NRHP: December 23, 1969
- Boundary increase: November 27, 2019

The Jonesborough Historic District is a historic district in Jonesborough, Tennessee, that was listed on the National Register of Historic Places as Jonesboro Historic District (reflecting the spelling of the town name at the time) in 1969.

Staff of the Tennessee Historical Commission surveyed 158 buildings in the town in 1969 and found 72 worth preservation. The district includes Queen Anne, Greek Revival, and Federal styles of architecture among its 72 contributing buildings located in a more than 120-acre (49 ha) area.

Some contributing buildings include the Jonesborough United Methodist Church, which was built in 1847 and renovated in 1945 and 1959; the Washington County Courthouse, built in 1913 on the site of the first courthouse of the county; and the Chester Inn, which was built c. 1797.

The district is an irregularly shaped area, roughly bounded by College Street on the north, the junction of Main Street and Franklin Avenue on the east, Depot Street on the south, and 3rd Avenue on the west.

== Architectural styles ==
There are very few examples of the pure classical style in Jonesborough. However, buildings in the district can be divided into at least six different primary styles, although they all exhibit characteristics of one or more secondary styles. Examples include the following.

=== Federal ===
Some of the oldest buildings in Jonesborough are built in the Federal style. The form of this period is basically Georgian, often with crow-stepped gables (also known as corbie steps). Most of the brickwork is Flemish bond.

- Chester Inn: Listed separately on the NRHP, the Chester Inn is a three-story rectangular building, including the raised stone basement. Built in 1797, the west section of the building has a two-story kitchen. The dining room was built c. 1836, in the east addition, and the Italianate front porch was added in 1883.
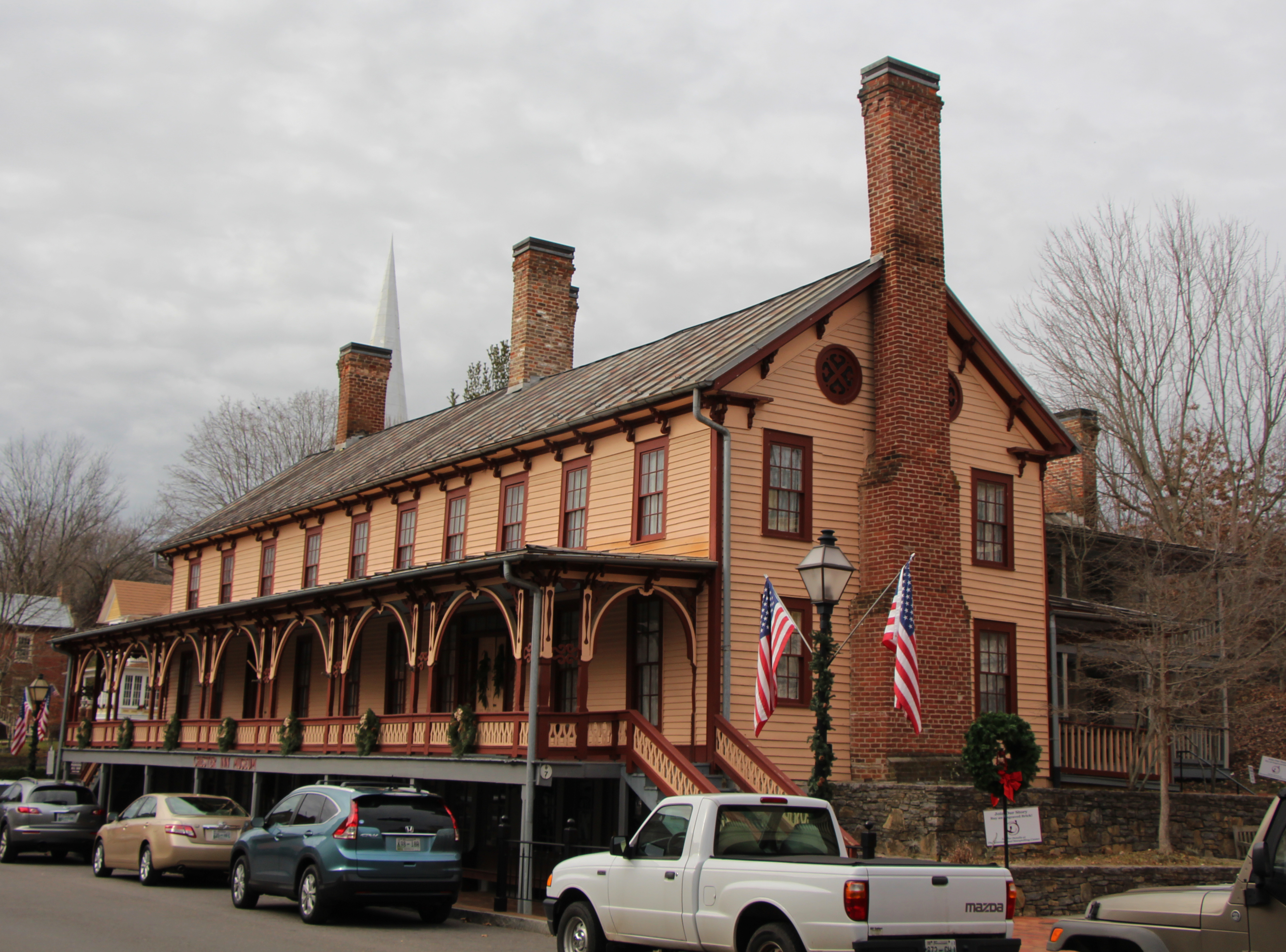
Chester Inn, looking west, 116 W. Main Street, West end built 1797 and east end built c. 1836

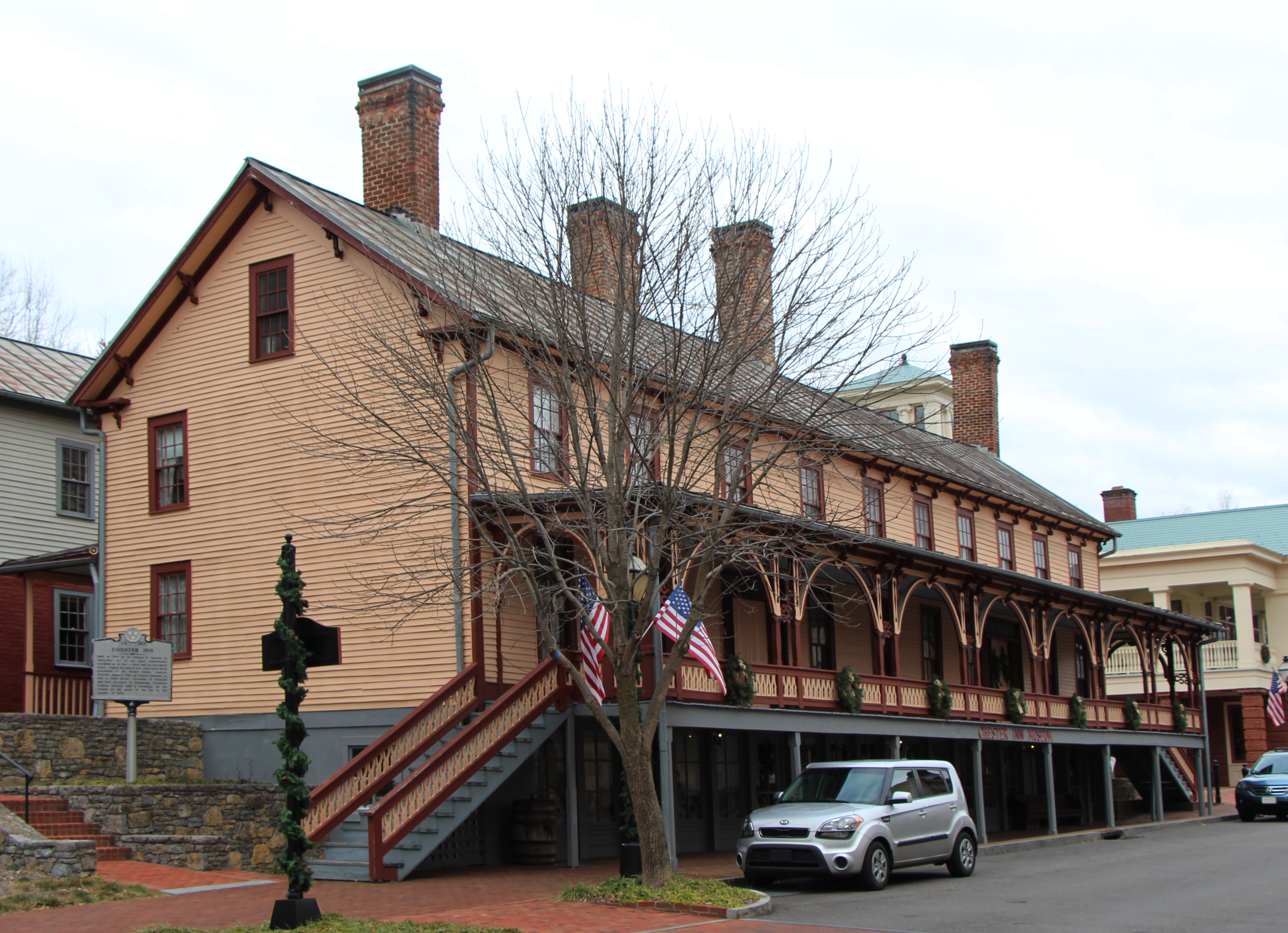
Chester Inn, looking east

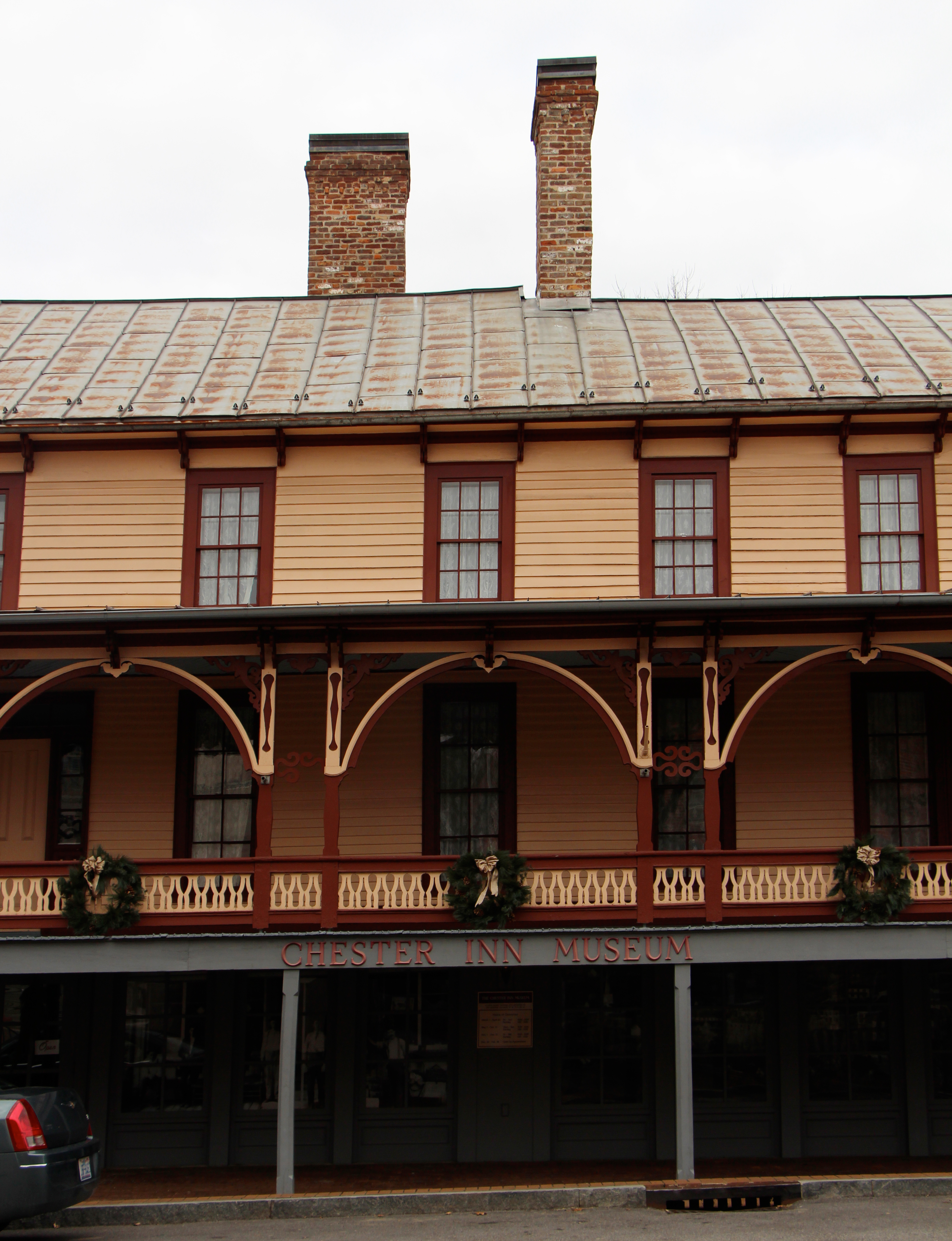
Chester Inn, looking north. The join between the original 1797 building and the 1836 addition is visible in roofline between the two mismatched chimneys.

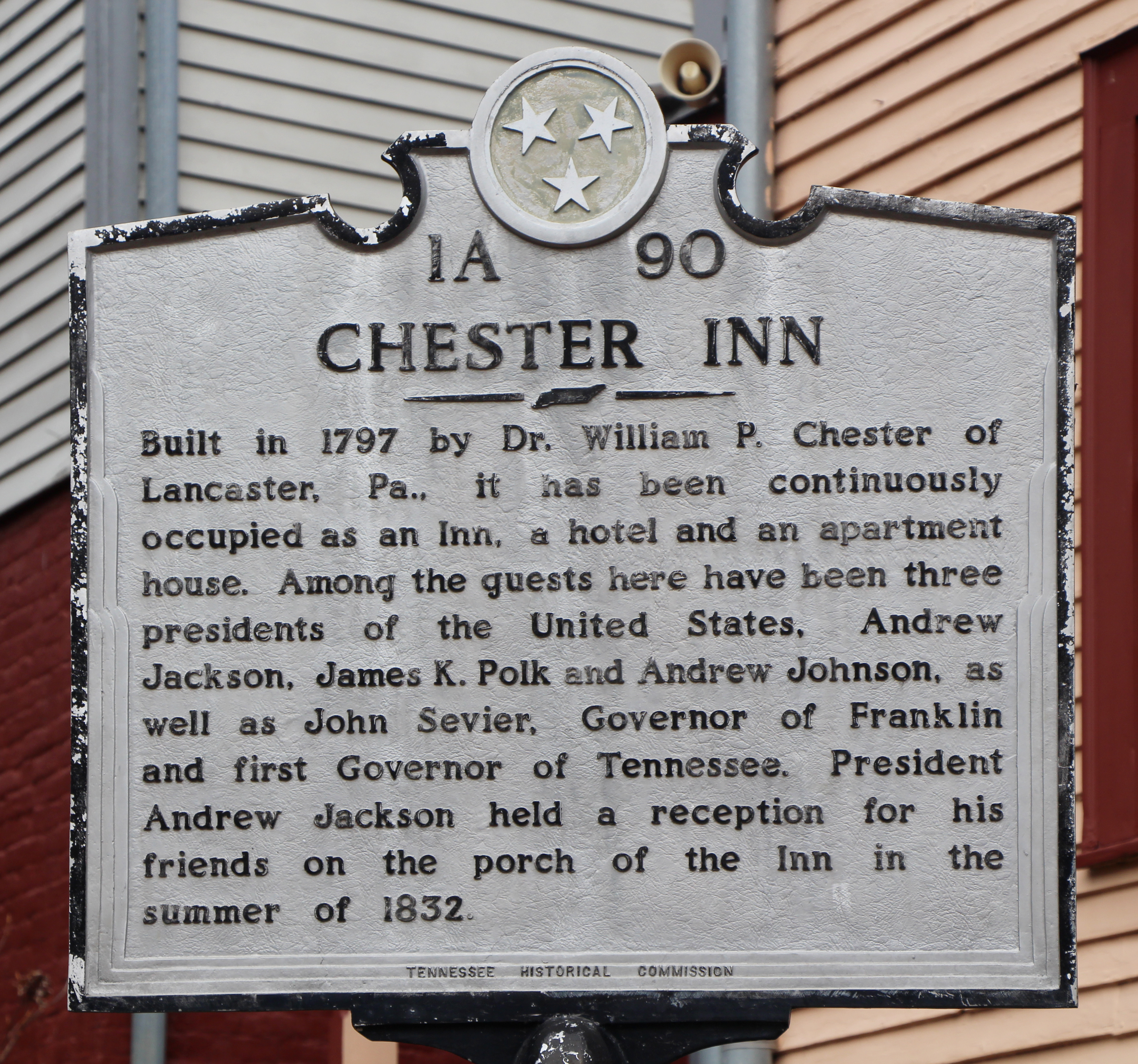
Chester Inn plaque
- Sister's Row: Sometimes incorrectly referred to as House of the Three Sisters, Sister's Row was built by Samuel D. Jackson as homes for his three daughters. Constructed of hand-molded bricks on a stone foundation, the two-story buildings are connected under one roof but have separate entrances and details. The large outline is rectangular with an ell. The porches are historic additions.
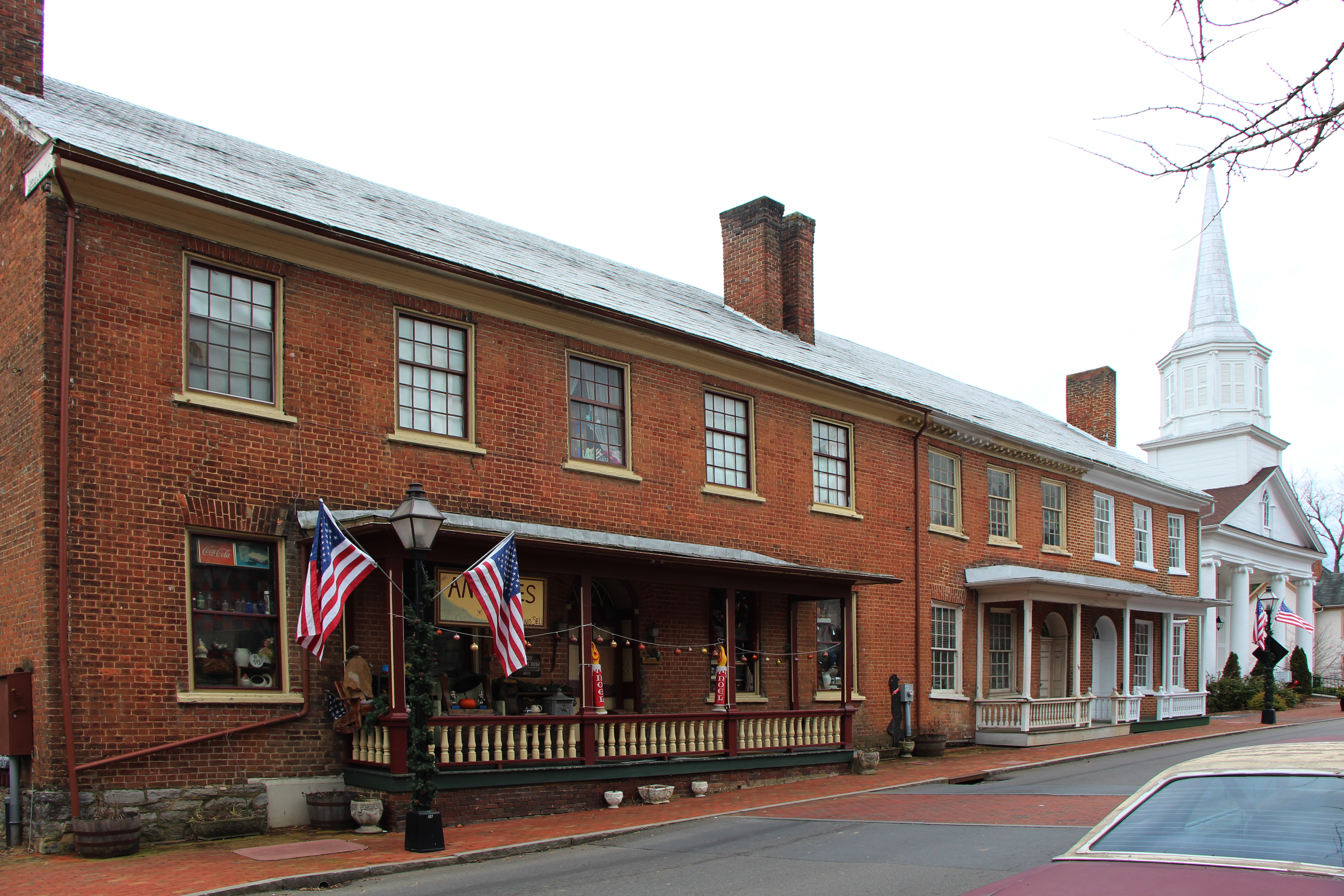
Sister's Row, looking west, 205–209 W. Main Street, built 1821

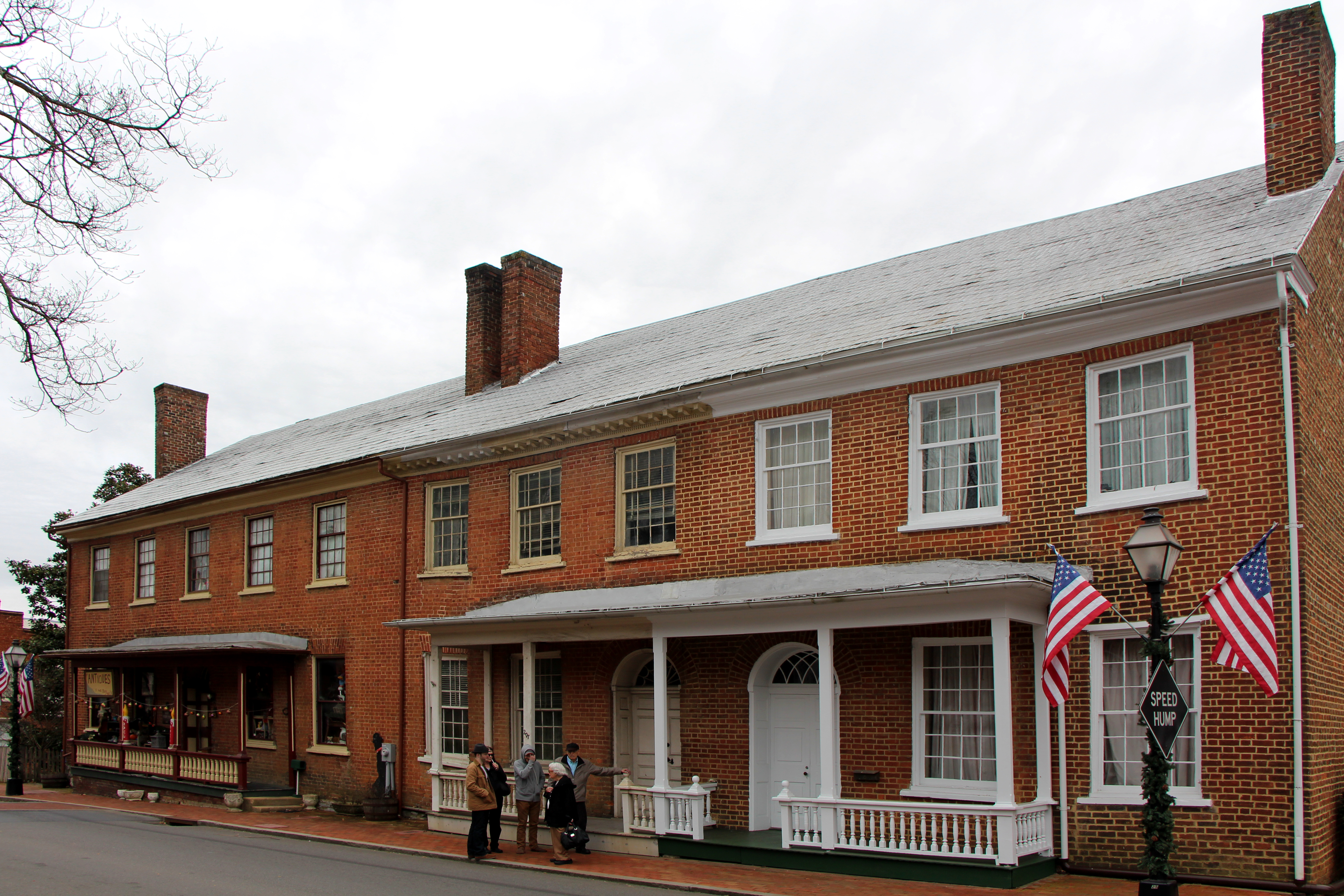
Sister's Row, looking east
- Green's Mansion: Green's Mansion was built by John Green, farmer and real estate agent. It is a two-story, rectangular building, with an ell. The front porch is the only one that represents the Federal Style. The foundation is stone.
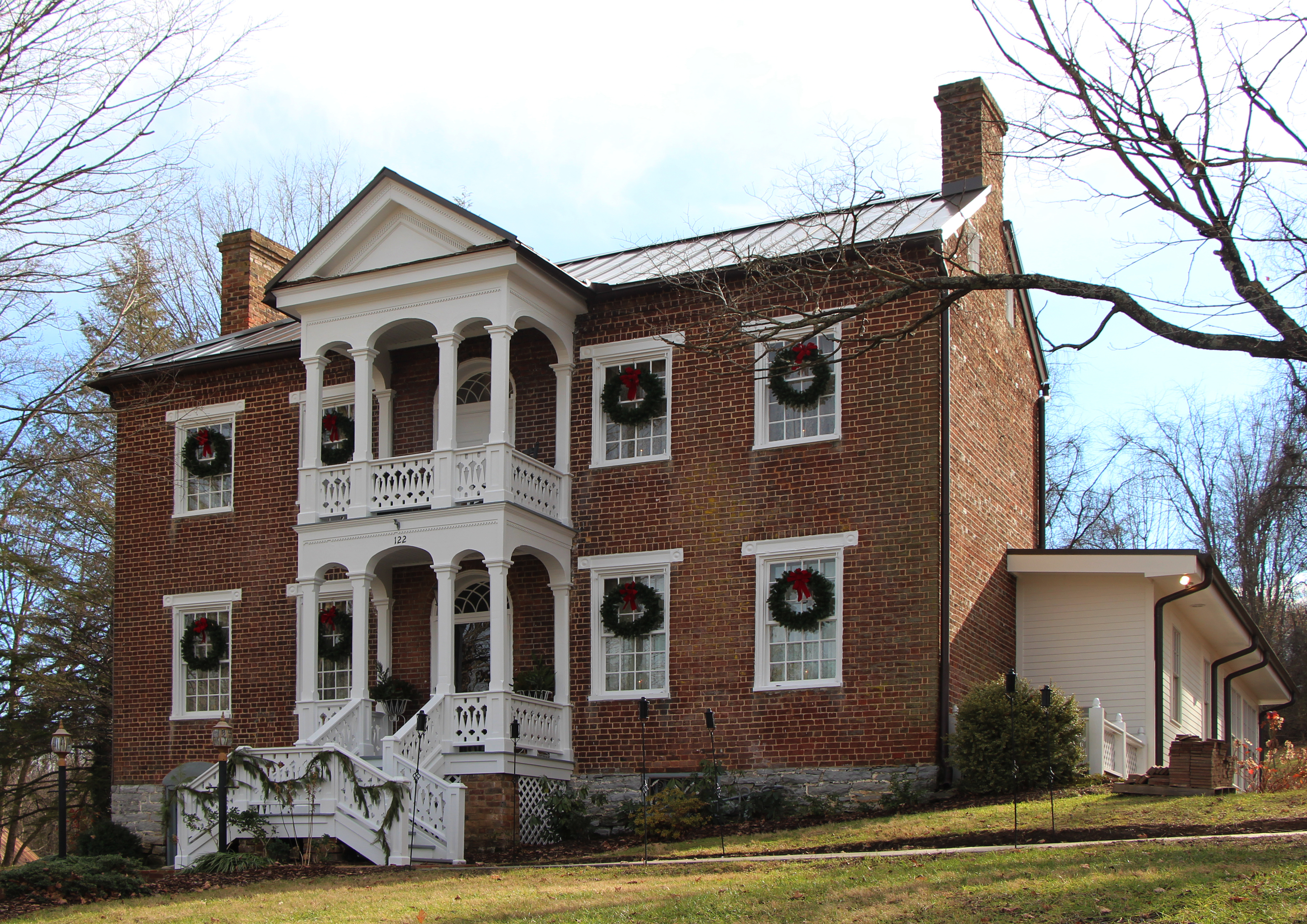
122 E. Woodrow Avenue, built c. 1815
- Old Jonesborough Female Academy: This building was used as a school until 1852. The building is one-story and made of brick. It is rectangular with an ell addition in about 1854. The original part of the house was a one-room school with a small side room. The porch was added in c. 1890.
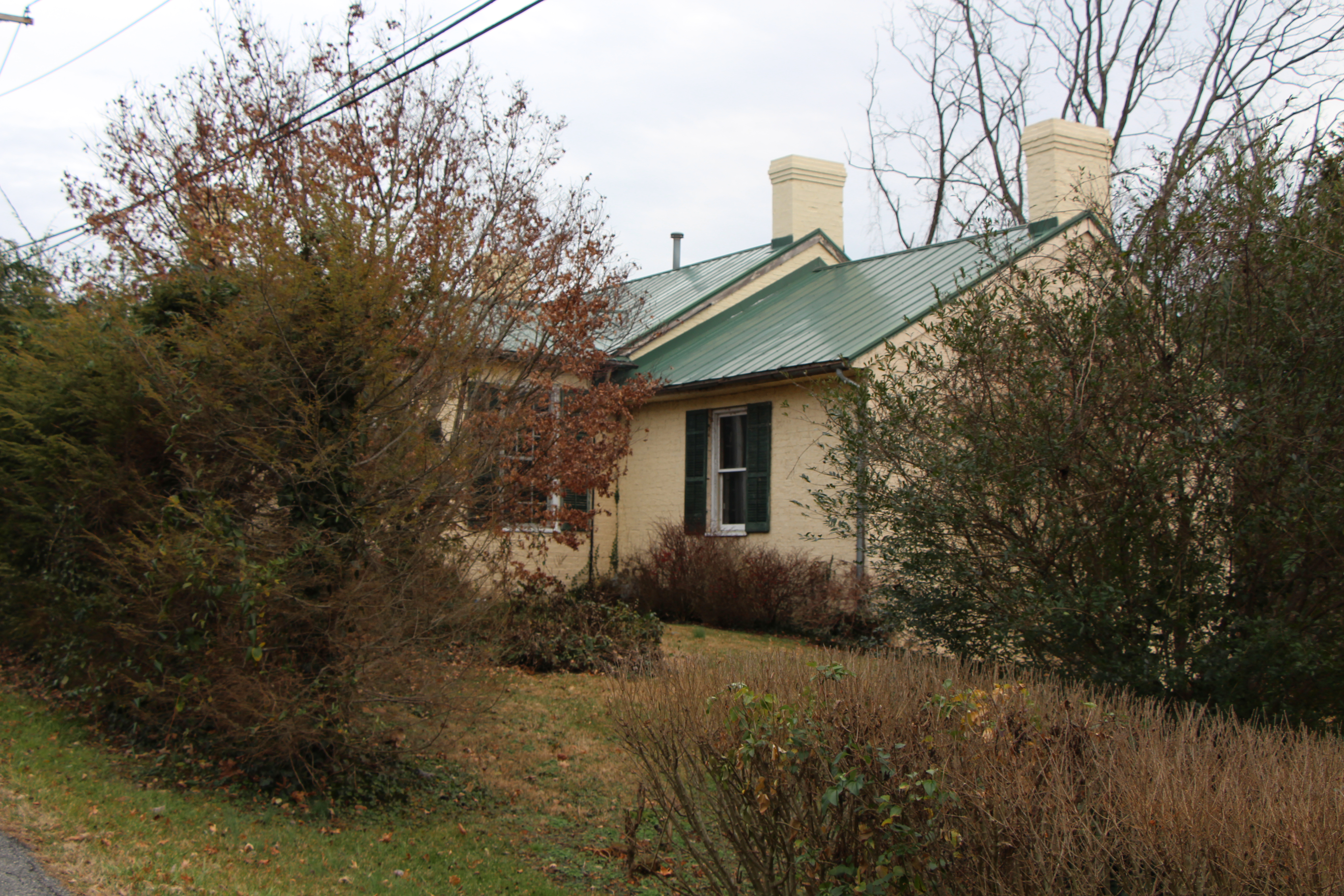
Old Jonesborough Female Academy, 205 W. College Street, built c. 1834
- Jacobs House: As of 1969, the former residence was operating as the Jonesborough Bed and Breakfast. The house is rectangular in shape. The foundation is stone. The porch is located on the second level.
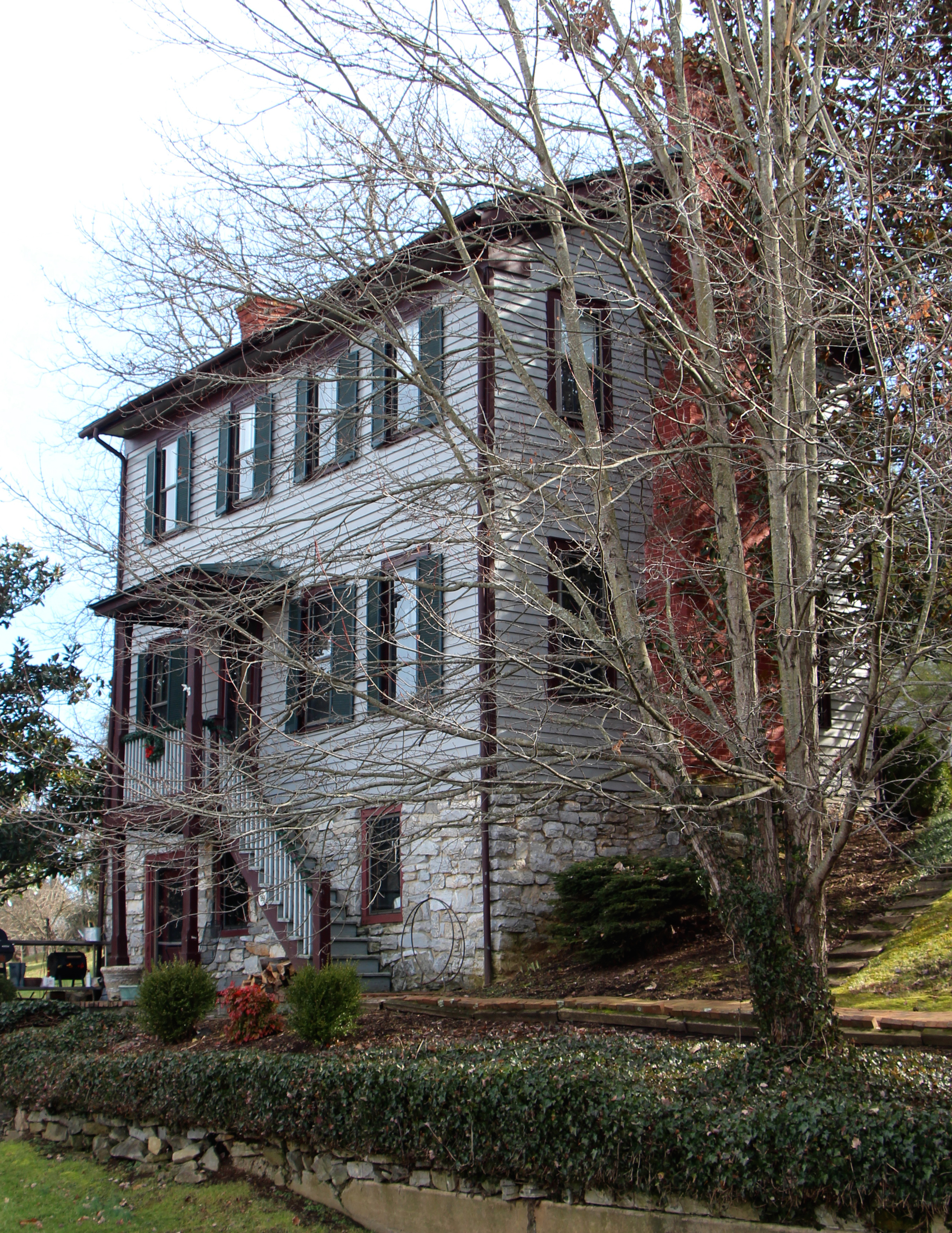
Jacobs House, 106 E. Woodrow Avenue, built c. 1831
- Gammon-Moss House: This house is three stories and has a rectangular shape with a one-story addition to the east side of the house, built about 1900. The foundation and siding are brick. The roof shape is gable with corbiesteps.
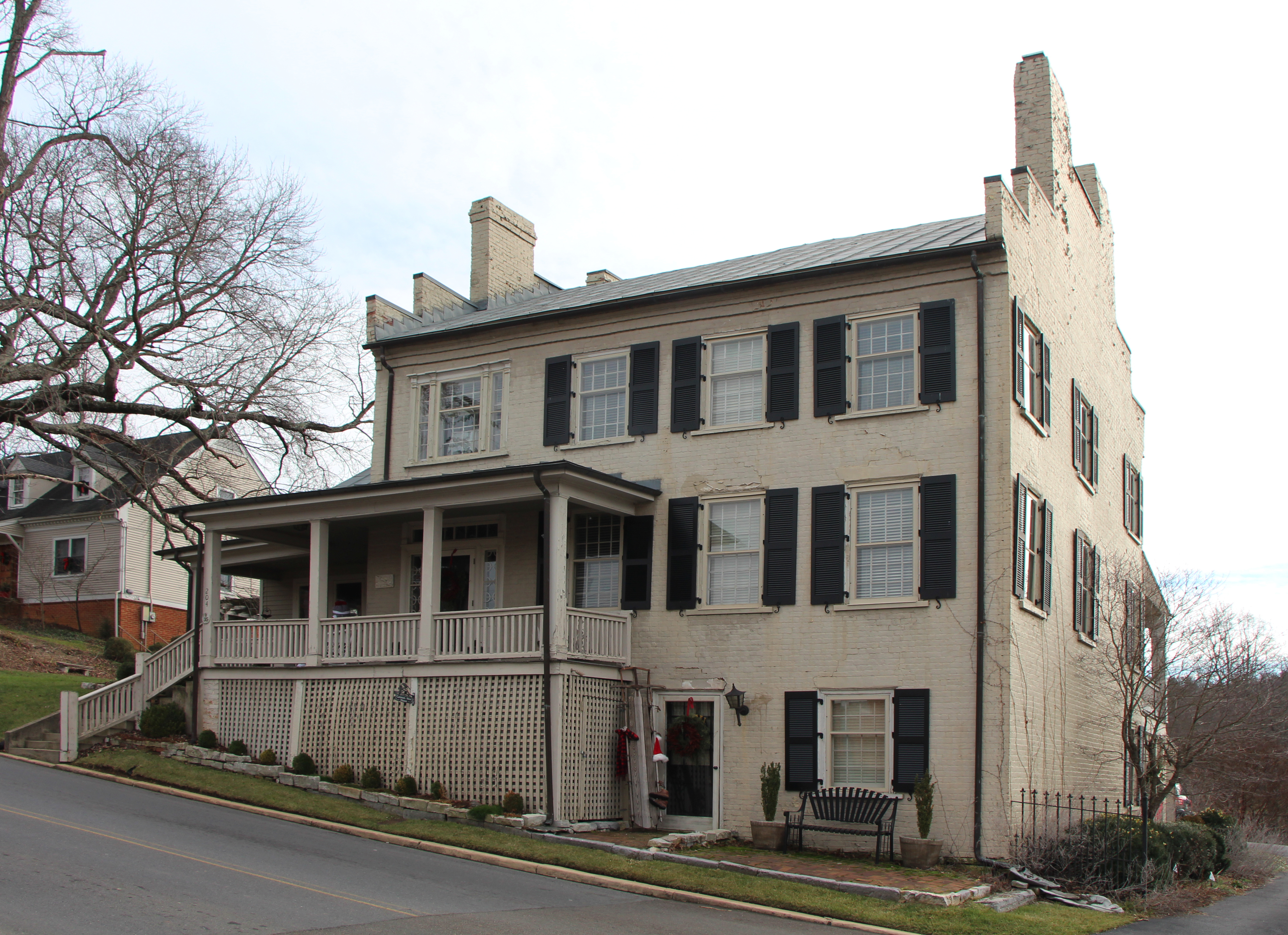
Gammon-Moss House, 204 E. Main Street, built c. 1830; Federal style with Greek Revival influences
- Blair-Moore House: The historic name is the Old Blair House. As of 2014, it is operated as a bed and breakfast. It is two stories of an irregular shape. The foundation is brick with c. 1870 penciling. The roof shape is gable with corbiesteps.
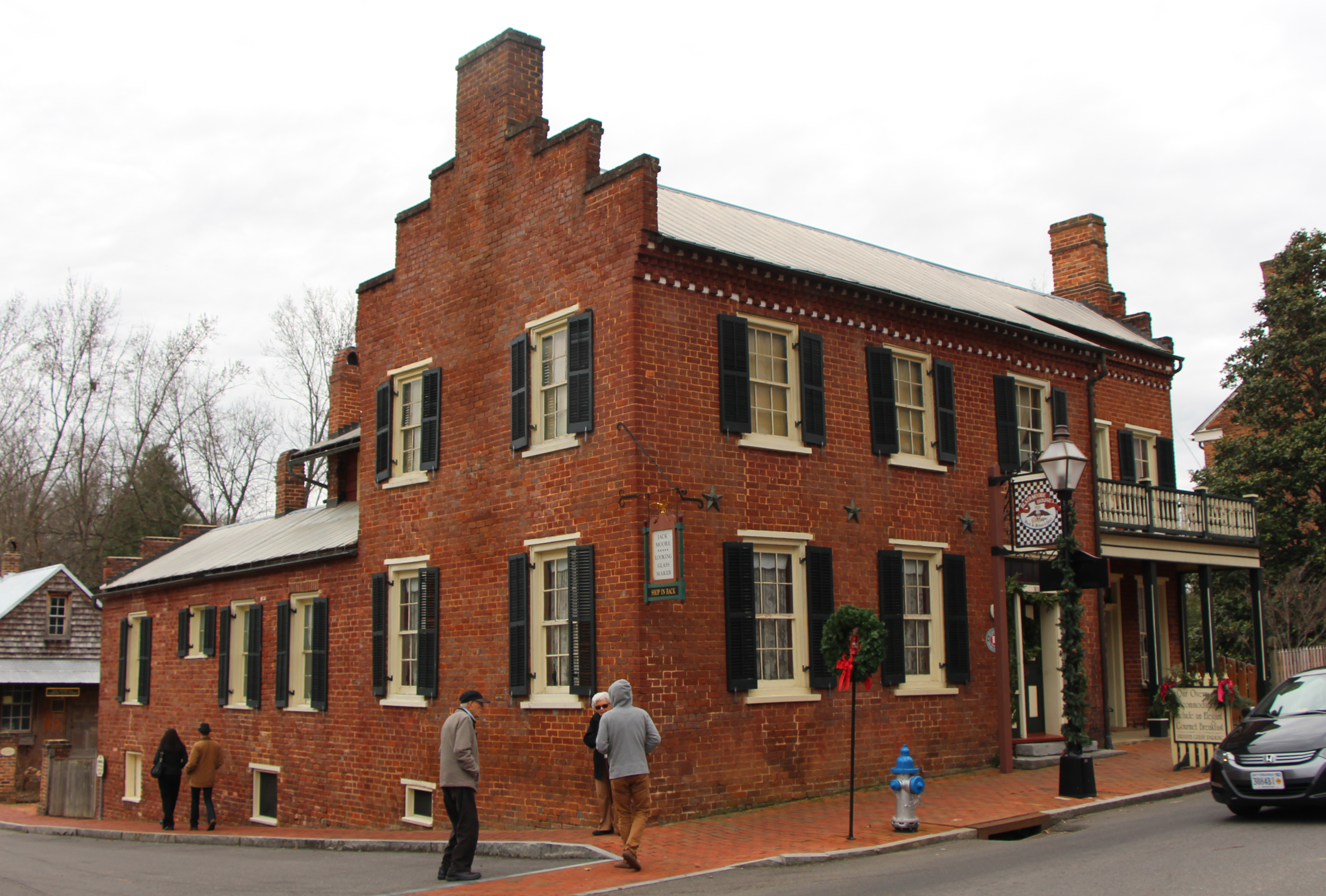
Blair-Moore House, 201 W. Main Street, built c. 1830; Federal style with Greek Revival influences

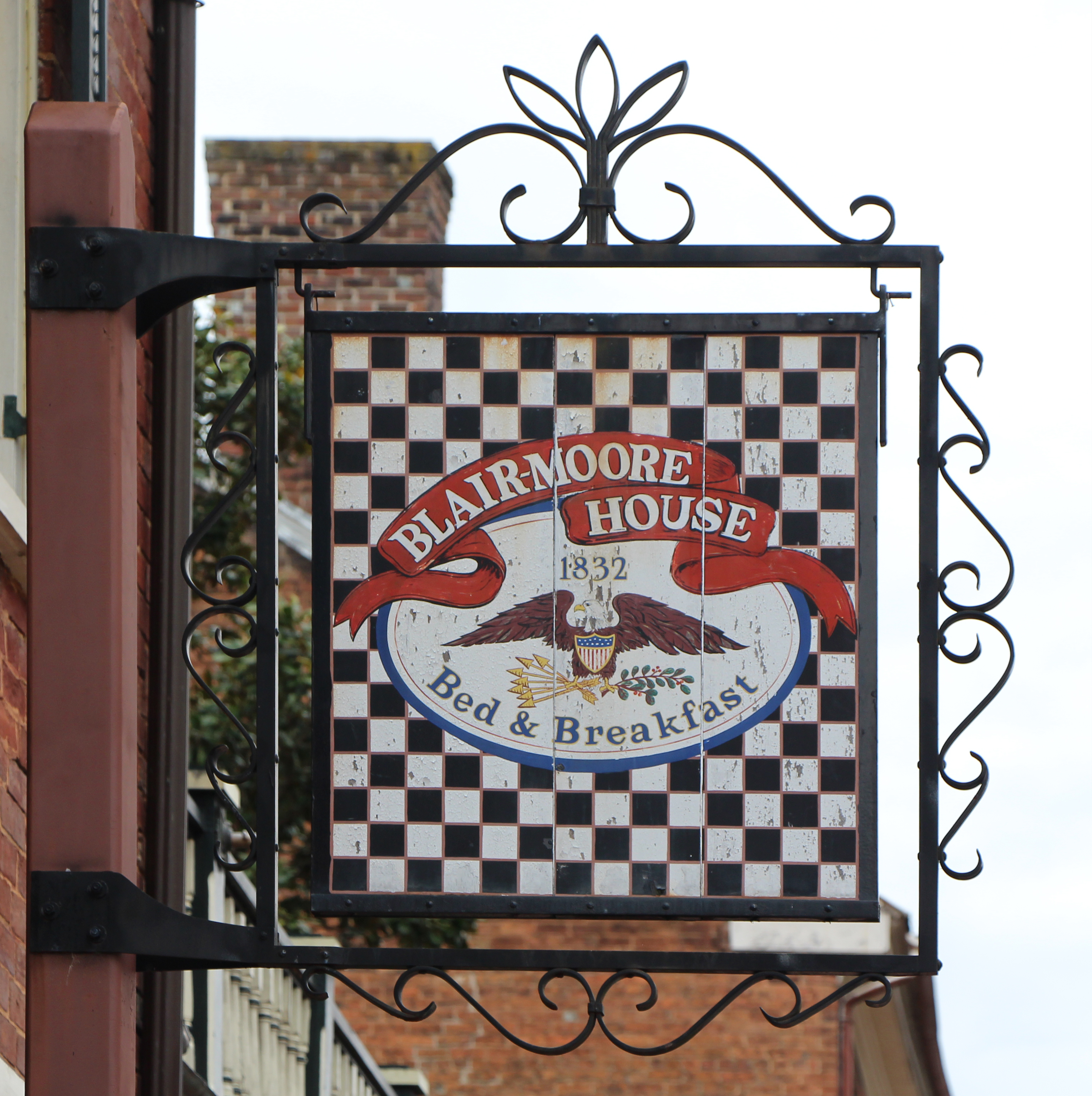
Blair-Moore B&B

=== Greek Revival ===
Corbie steps also appear in Jonesborough Greek revival buildings. Most of the porches on Greek Revival homes appear to have been added long after the buildings were constructed.

- Jonesborough United Methodist Church: Listed separately as a National Historic Place, the Methodist Church is two stories with a rectangular shape. The foundation and siding are brick. The roof shape is gable. The building has a pedimented portico, with four Ionic columns. It has stained glass windows. An educational wing was added in the mid-1800s. The steeple was constructed in c. 1890, and replaced an earlier one. The original slave gallery remains.
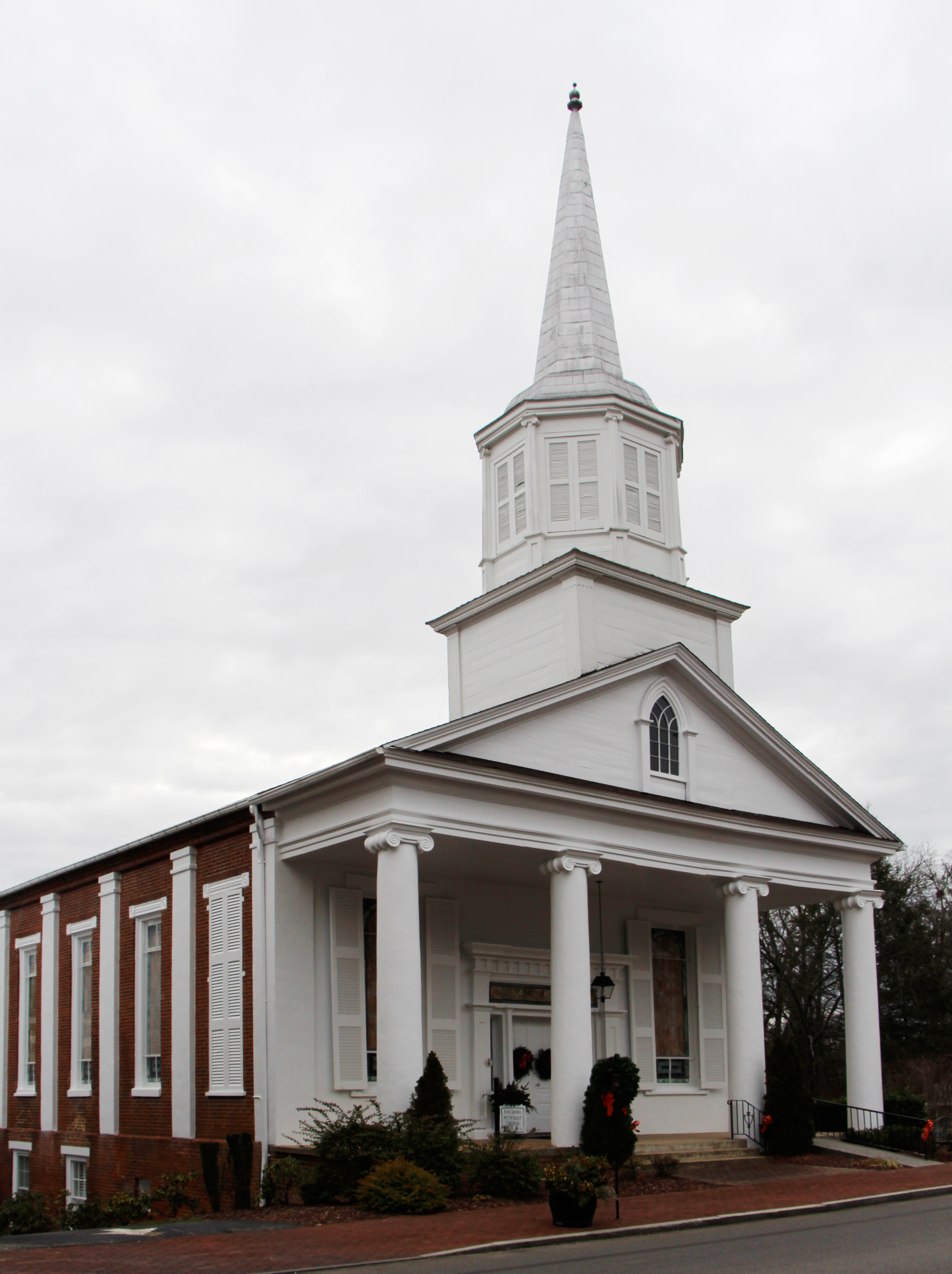
Methodist Church, 211 W. Main Street, c. 1845

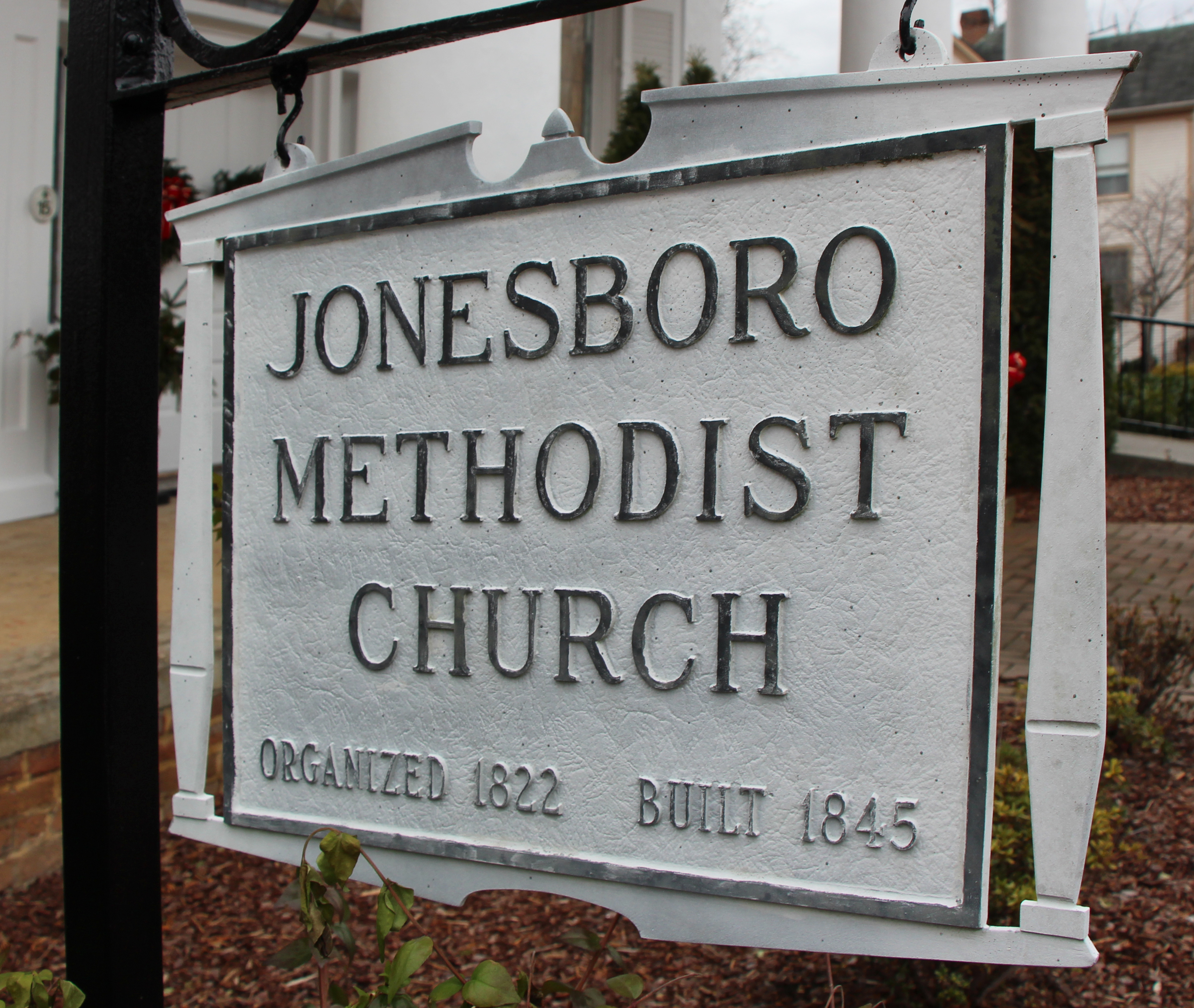
Methodist Church
- First Baptist Church: The building is two stories and has a rectangular shape. The foundation and siding are brick. The steeple is weatherboarded and has brackets and openings capped by Gothic arches. The building has stained glass windows. An educational wing was added in about 1940. In the 1960s a two-story educational wing was added.
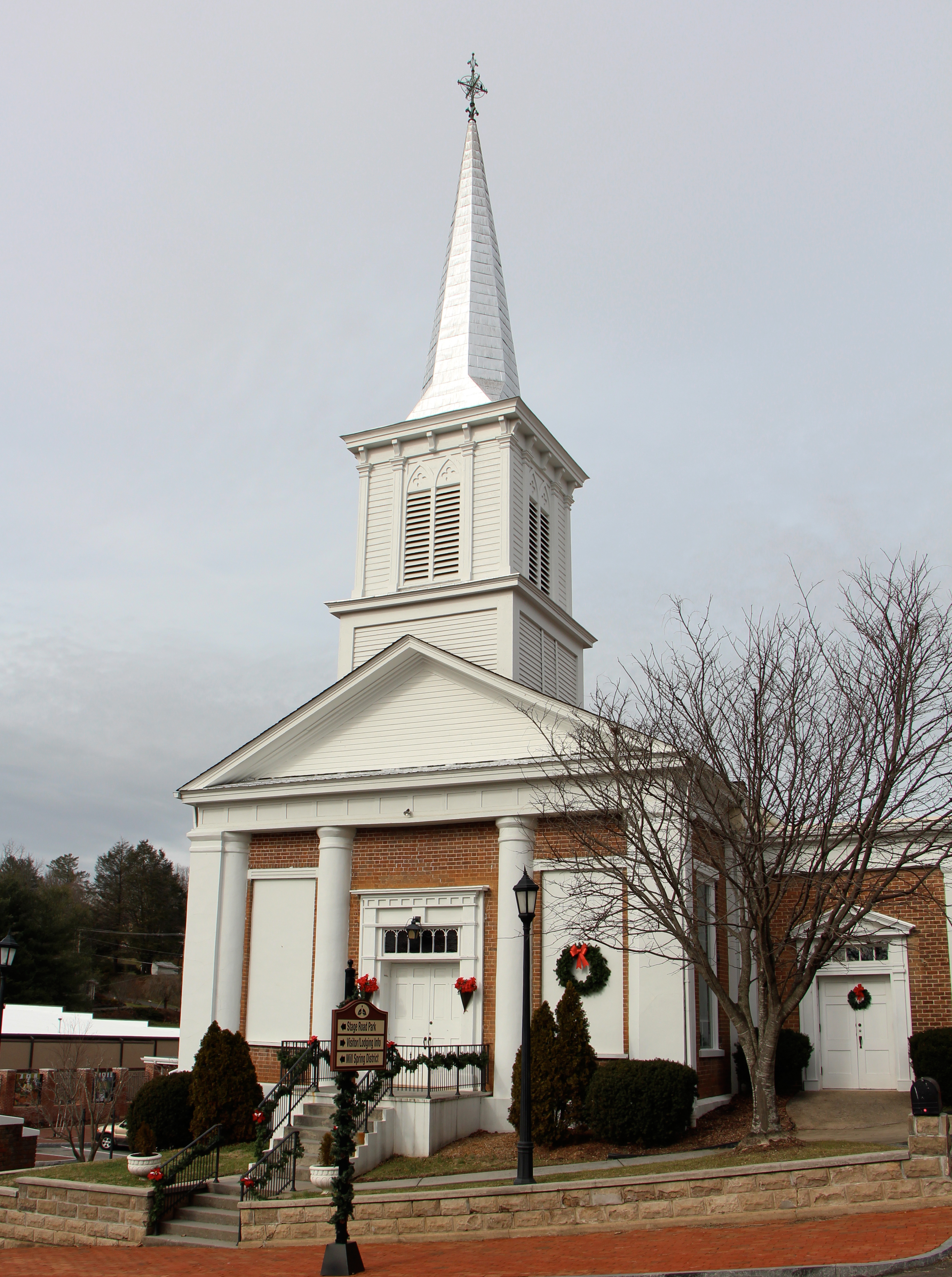
Baptist Church, 201 E. Main Street, c. 1840
- Jonesborough Presbyterian Church: The building is two stories with a rectangular shape. The foundation and siding are brick. The roof shape is gable. Triglyphs and dentils are in the frieze. The building has a pedimented portico on the second story with fluted columns. A two-story educational wing was added to the rear of the building in the mid-1900s.
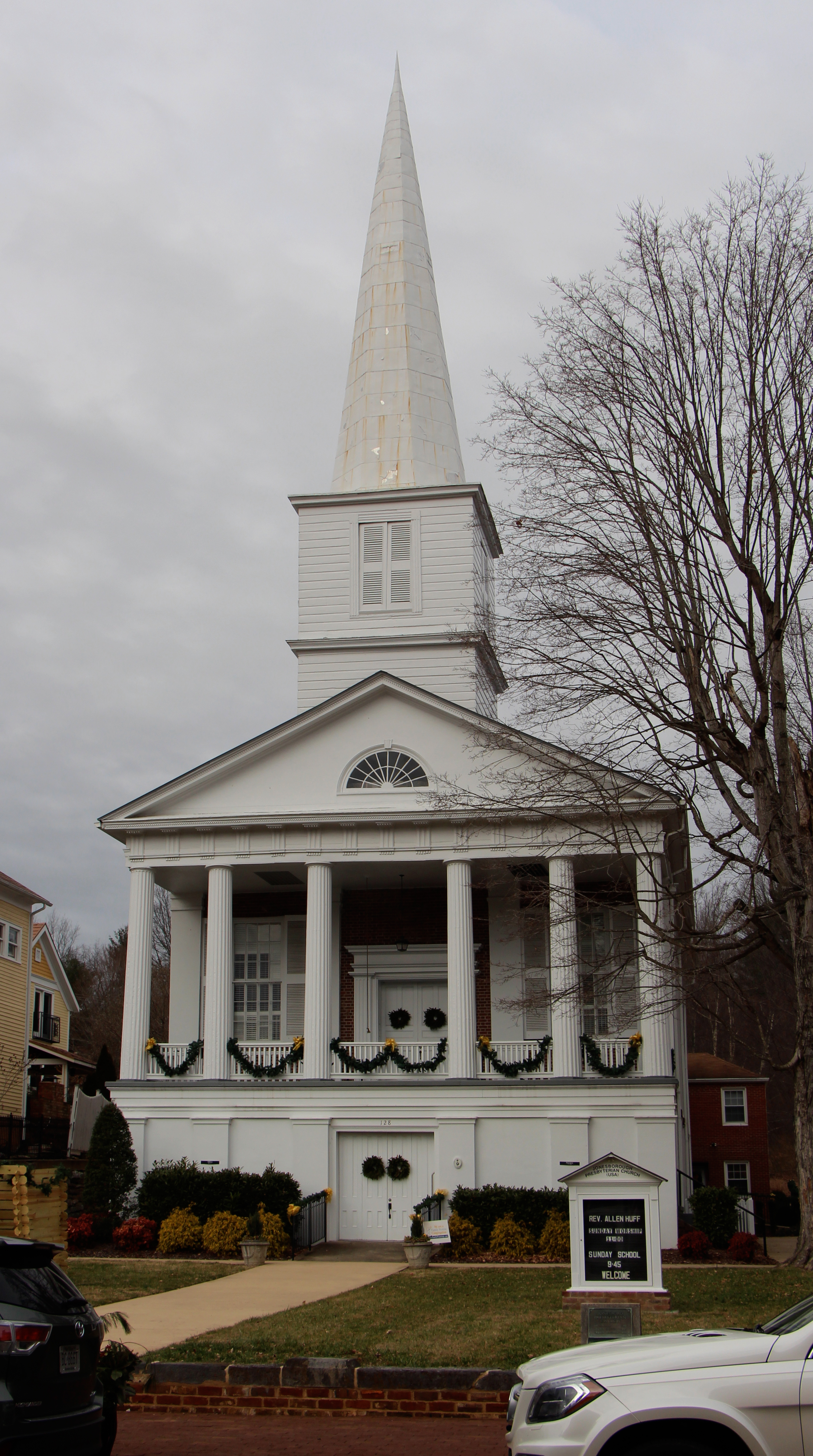
Presbyterian Church, 126 W. Main Street, c. 1845
- Cunningham House: The building is two stories and is rectangular in shape with a two-story ell. The foundation and siding are brick. The porch was added in about 1895.
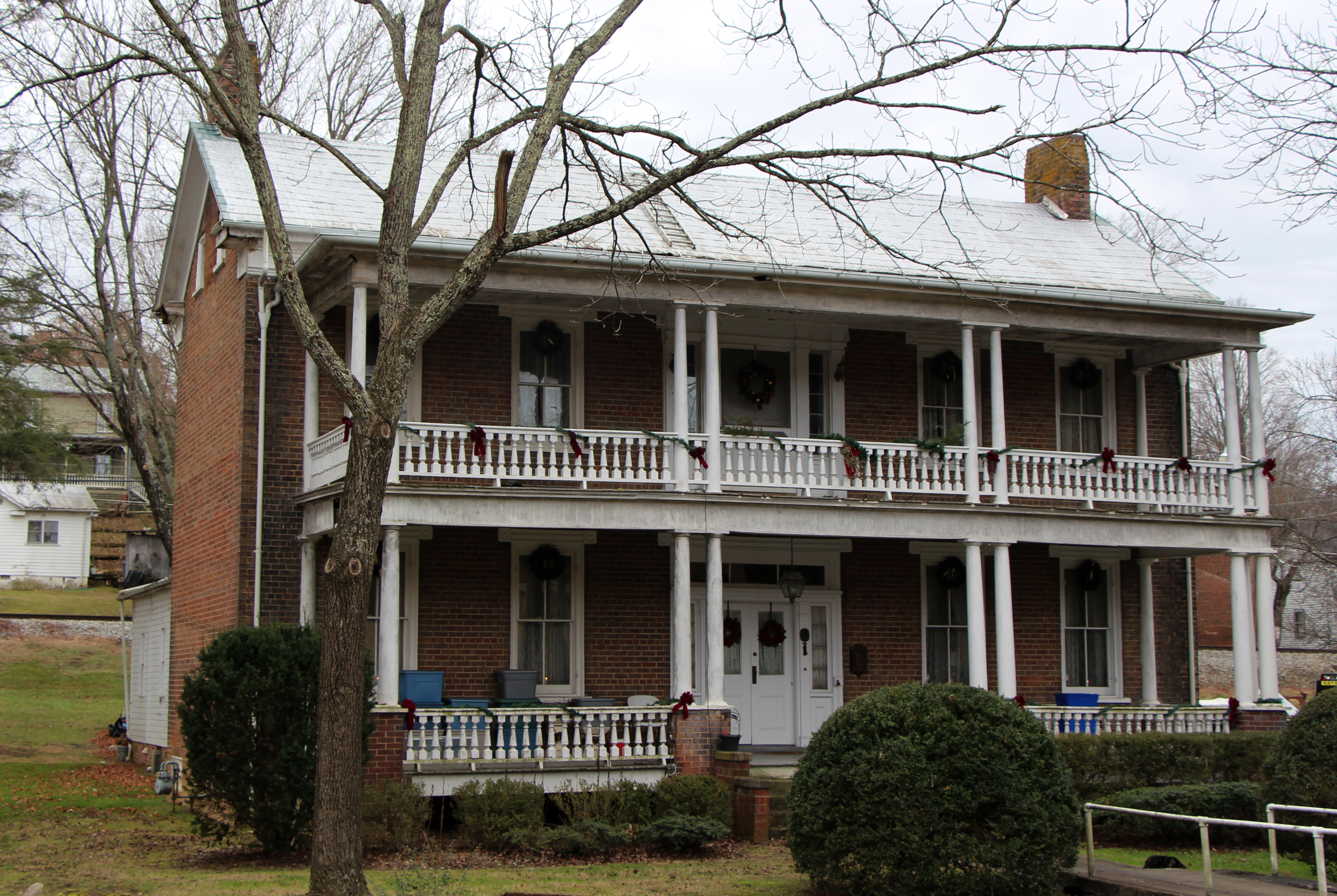
Cunningham House, 119 W. Main Street, c. 1840
- Febuary Hill: Also known as the Dossett Residence, the building is two stories and is rectangular in shape with a two-story ell. The foundation and siding are brick. The porch is two-story Greek Revival. The building has 9/9 windows on the first level and 6/9 windows on the second. There is an enclosed sunroom on the west side of the ell and a terrace on the east side of the ell; there are a front stoop and balusters, all added in about 1965.
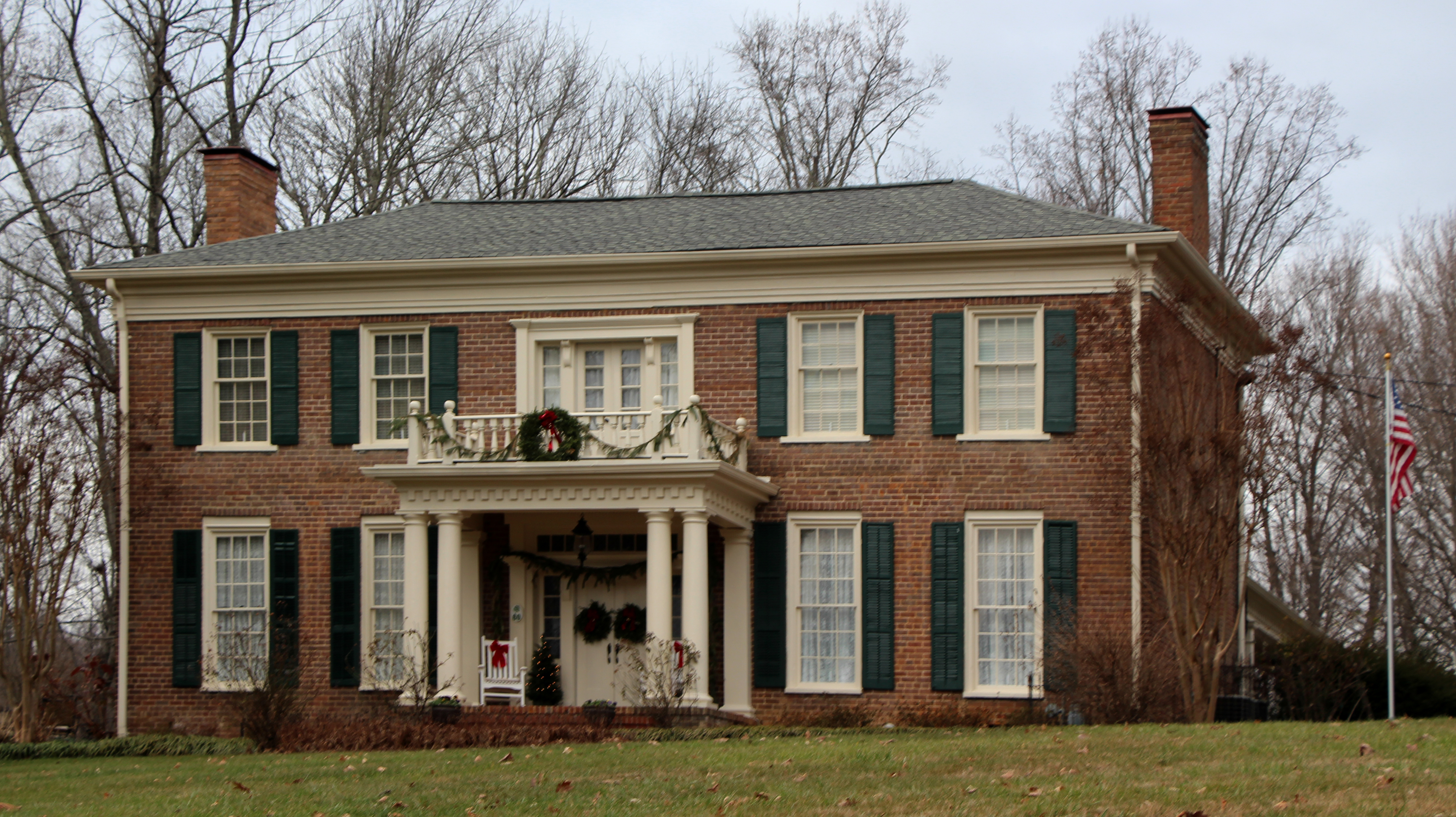
Febuary Hill, 102 W. College Street, 1832
- Walter Sherfey Home: The building is two stories and is rectangular in shape with a two-story ell. The foundation and siding are brick. It has a porch that spans three-fourths of the façade and has square columns on the bases. It has 8/8 windows.
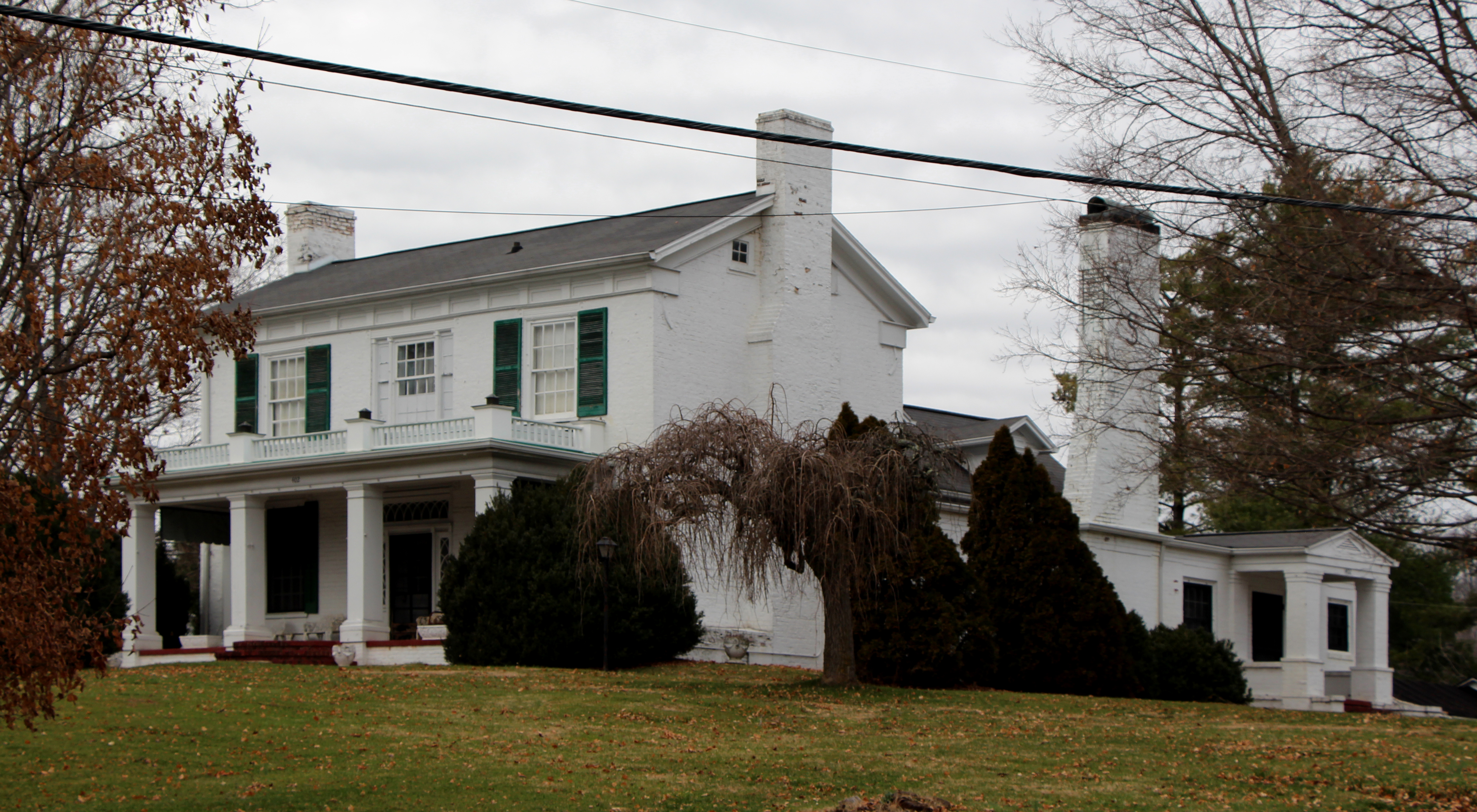
Walter Sherfey Home, 402 W. College Street, c. 1850
- Shipley House: Now known as the Shipley-Bledsoe House, the building is two stories and is rectangular in shape with a two-story ell. The foundation and siding are brick. The sides have a brick dentil trim, in contrast to paneled frieze on front and west façades. The porch covers all four of five bays (does not include the first left bay) and has turned wood posts and balustrade. There are sidelights and transoms with bull's-eyes and fluted colonettes around entries.
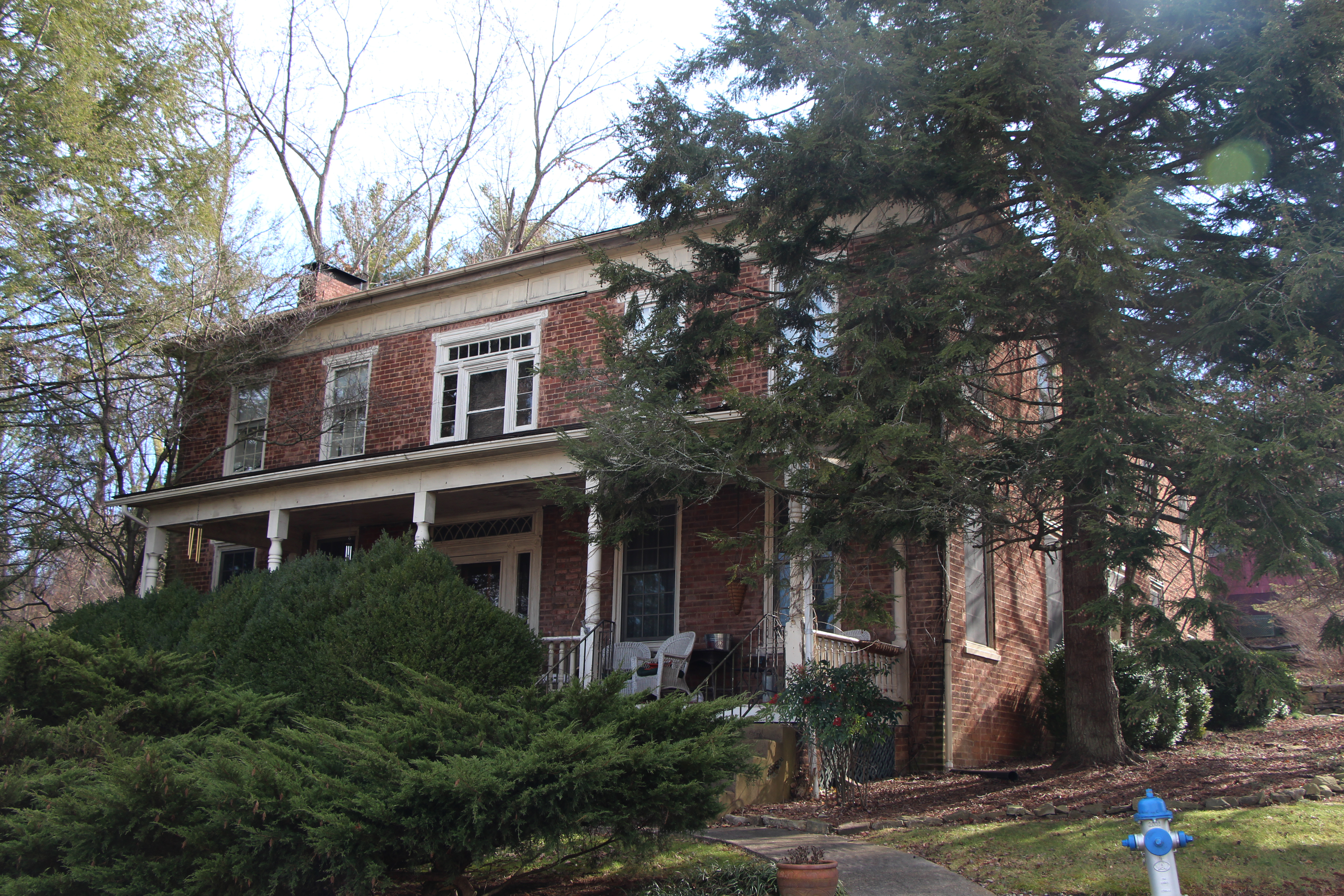
Shipley House, 100 E. Woodrow Avenue, c. 1848
- Mansion House: The building is two stories and is rectangular in shape with a two-story ell. The foundation and siding are brick. The façade is Flemish bond. The roof shape is gable corbiesteps. The porch on the second level is Italianate. The building has 12/12 windows.
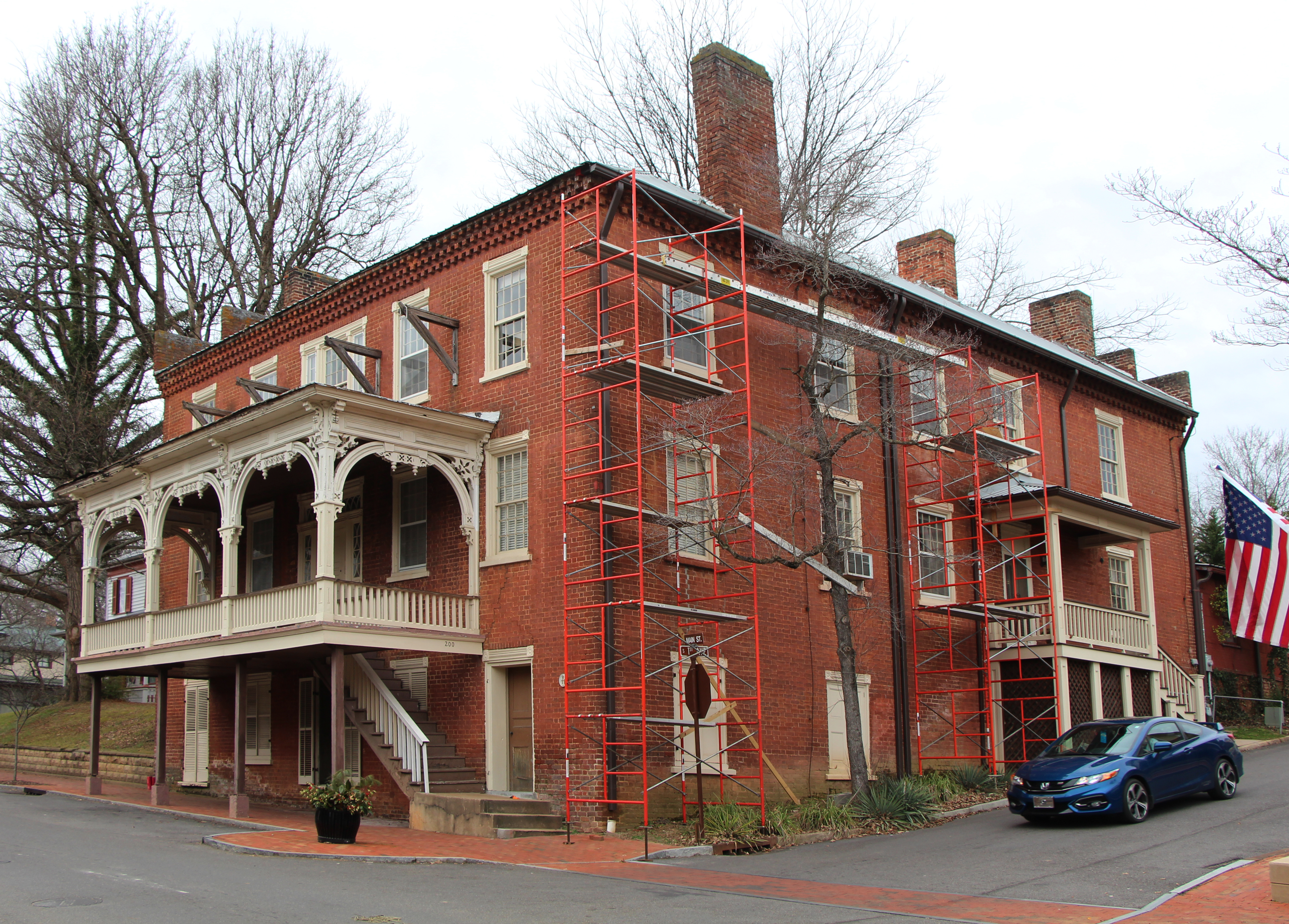
Mansion House, looking west, 200 W. Main Street, built 1849 with Federal influence

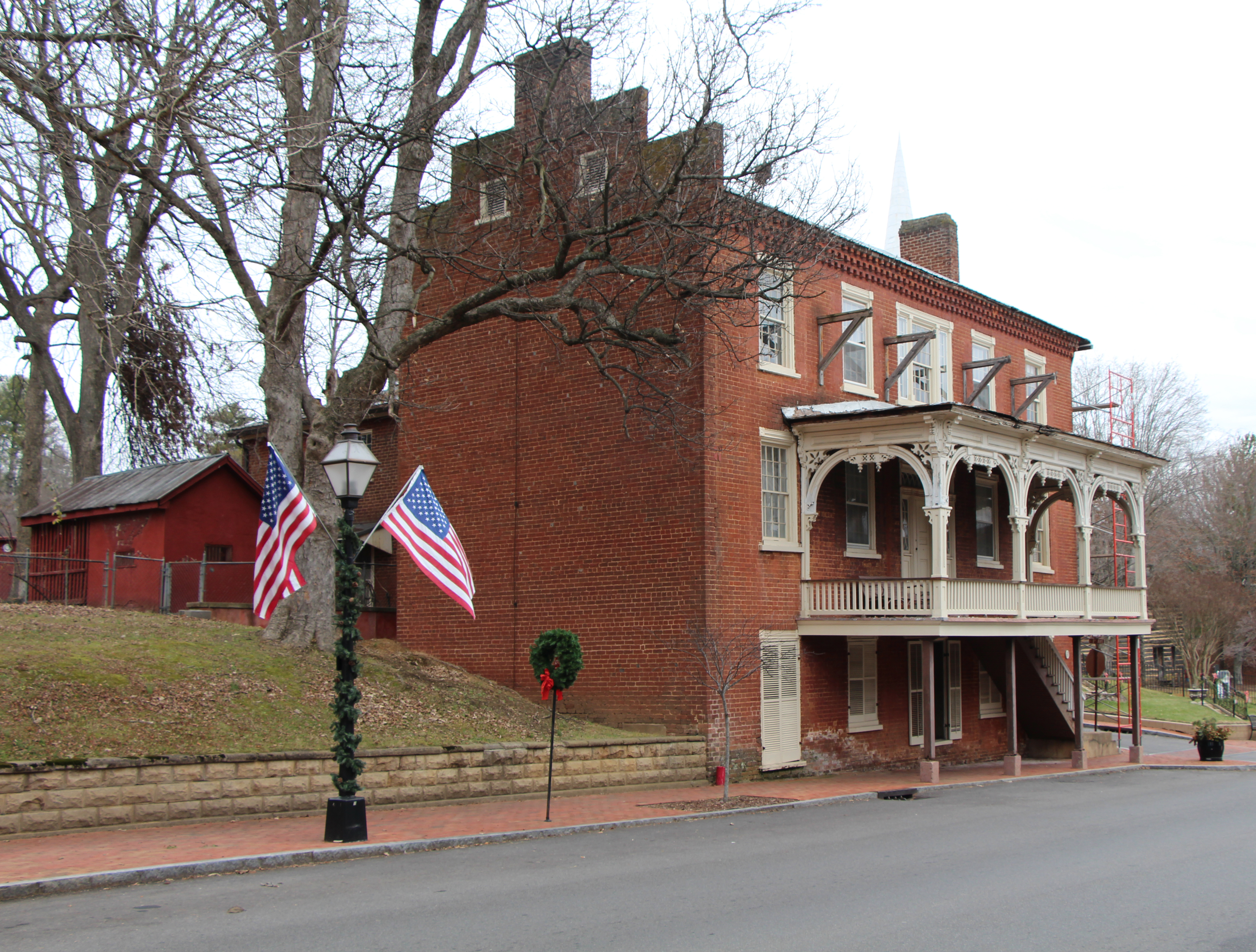
Mansion House, looking east

=== Victorian period ===
This period includes styles of Italianate, Gothic Revival, and Queen Anne. This style did not come to Jonesborough until around the Civil War. The Italianate style is very common, especially shown in porches.

The Old Gresham House

Built in 1828, the building was remodeled c. 1900 with Queen Anne and Colonial Revival influences. The building is two stories and has an irregular shape. The foundation is brick and the siding is weatherboard. The roof shape is gable. There are three chimneys: one of brick at center of gable, interior; one of brick at center gable, interior; one of brick at left rear end of gable, exterior. The house has a full front porch.

The Brownlow House
This house is rectangular in shape with a two-story ell. The foundation and siding are brick. The roof shape is hip with gablets. There are large dentils under the eaves of the roof. It was built in 1879 by Walter Preston Brownlow, nephew of William G. Brownlow. Walter owned the Jonesborough "Herald and Tribune". He was a postmaster and was elected U. S. Congressman in 1897.:

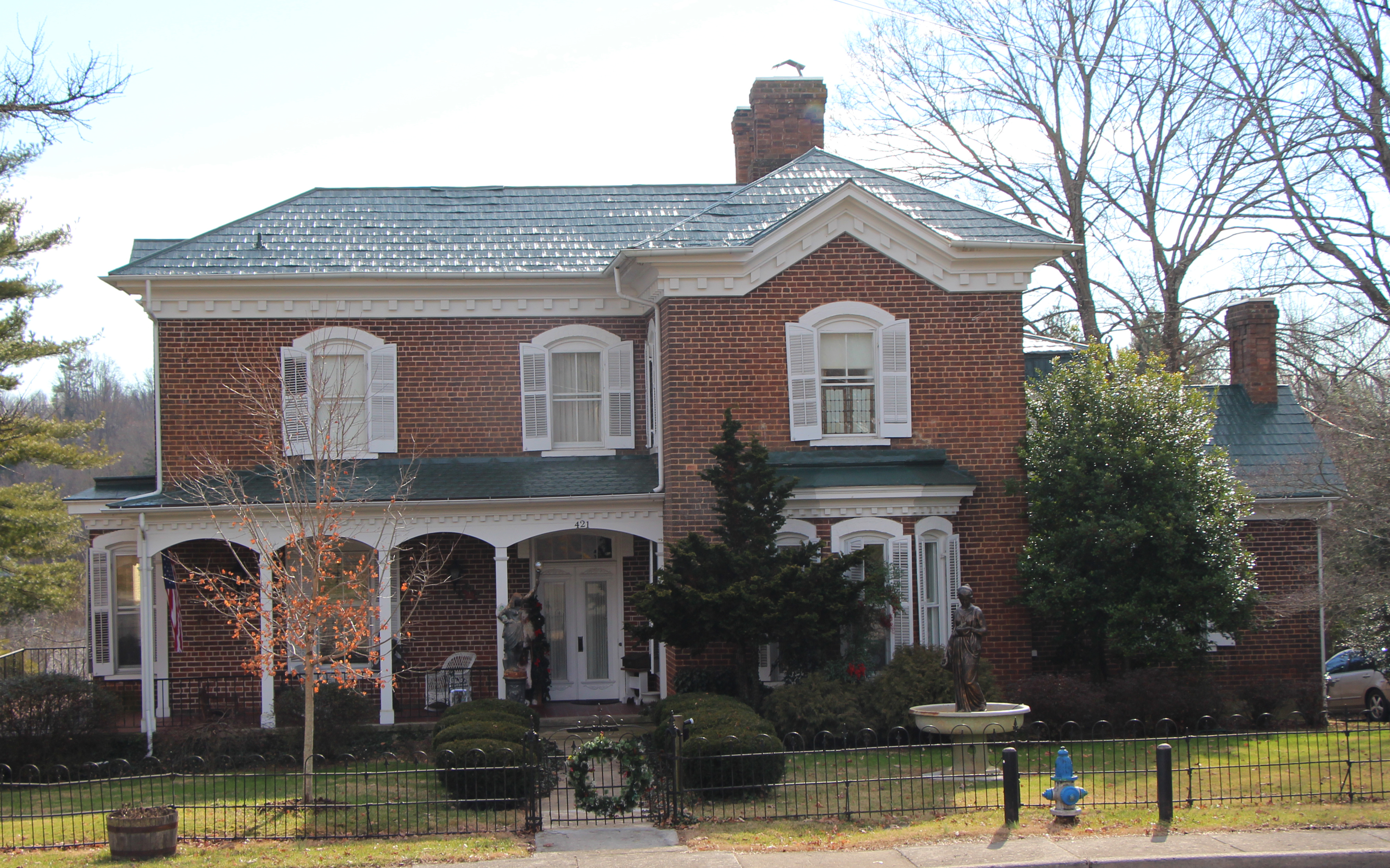
The Brownlow House, 421 W. Main Street, built 1879

Holston Baptist Female Institute
Also known as the Old Dungen School and the Warner Institute, the building is Italianate. The building is two stories and has an irregular shape. The foundation is stucco on brick and the siding is brick. The roof shape is hip. The porch dates from about 1910 and is Colonial Revival. There is also a Colonial Revival porch on the back. 12/12 windows date from about 1910. From 1876 to 1913 it was operated as a school to educate blacks, before the public school system was established.

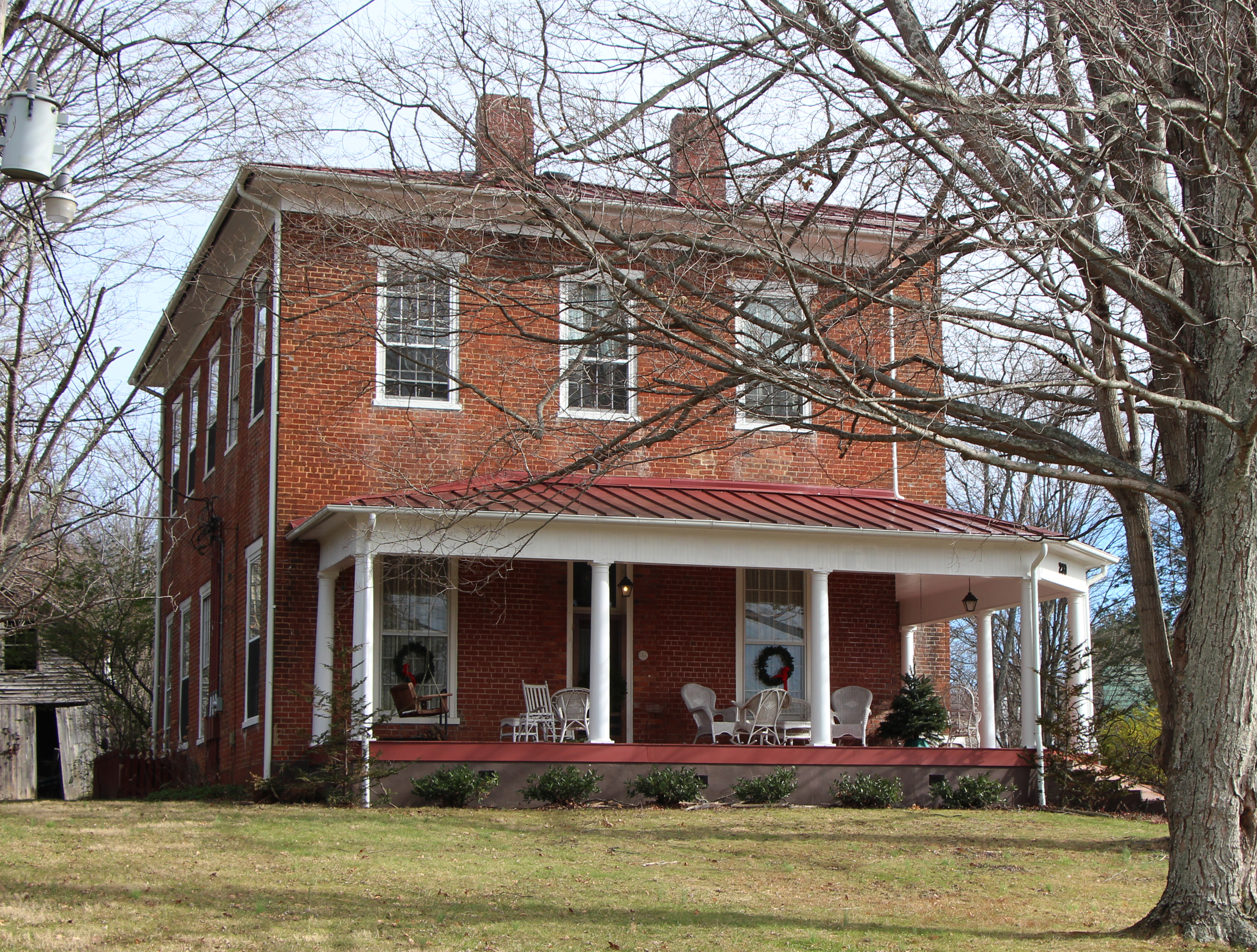
Holston Baptist Female Institute, 233 E. Main Street, c. 1855

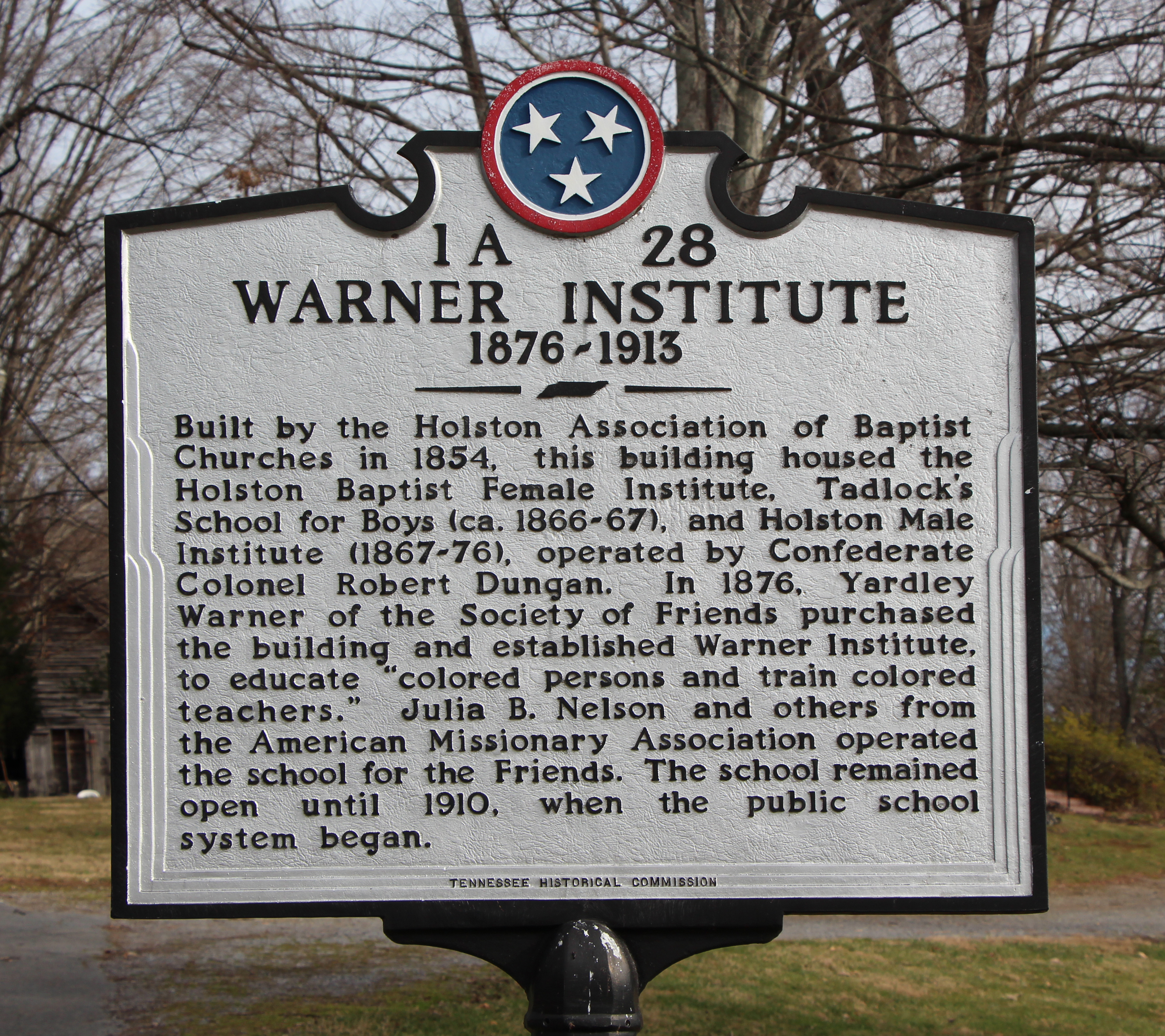
Holston Baptist Female Institute/Warner Institute Plaque

May-Dishner House
Originally the Humpston House was on this parcel, constructed c. 1800. The form of the present building, built about 1905, is gabled ell with Queen Anne influence. It is two stories with an irregular shape. The foundation is brick and the siding is weatherboard with patterned wood shingles in the gable. The building has 1/1 and 12/12 windows. Copies of the Manumission Intelligencier (aka The Emancipator) were printed in a shop on this parcel. It was the first periodical in the United States exclusively dedicated to the abolition of slavery.

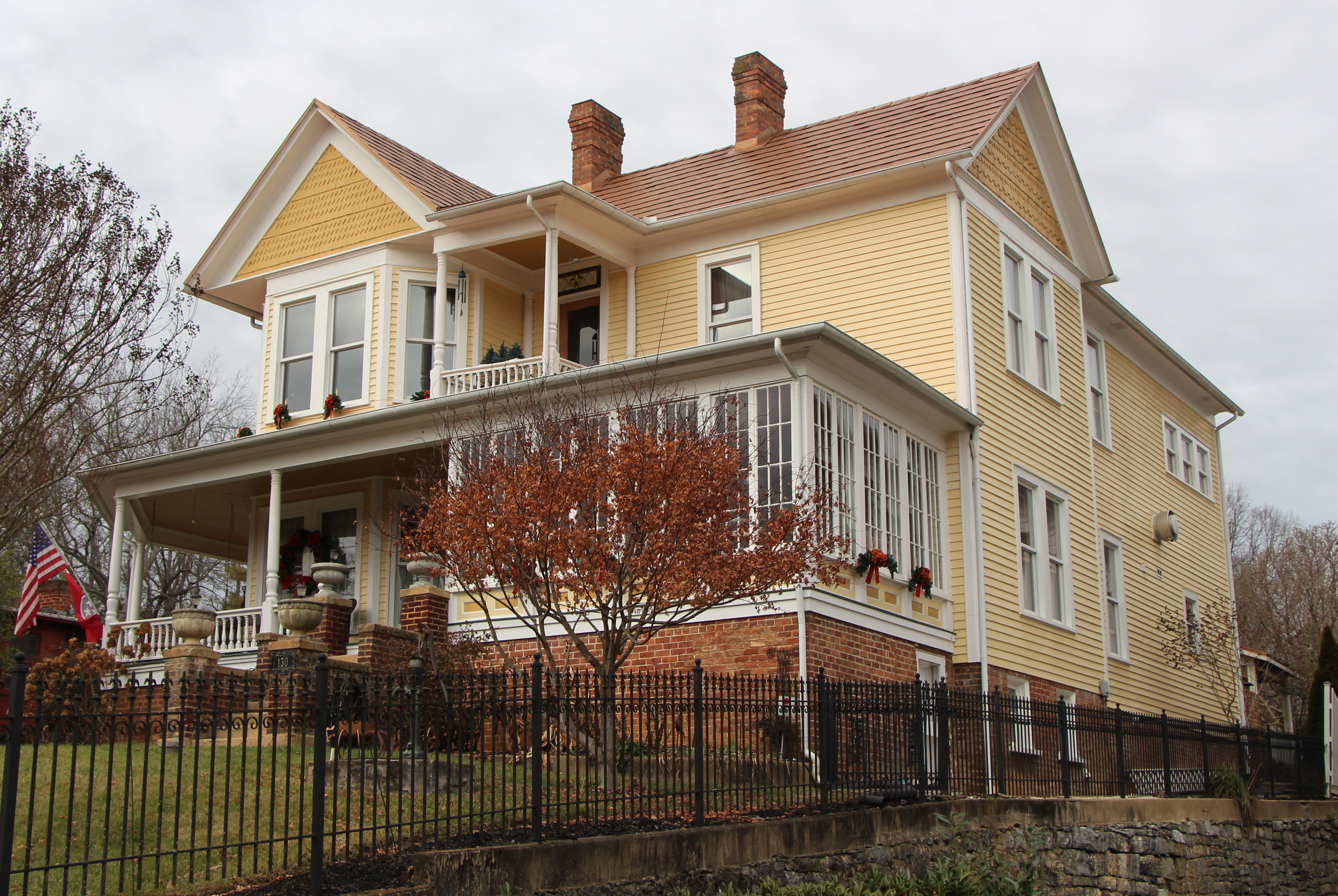
May-Dishner House, 130 W. Main Street, built c. 1905

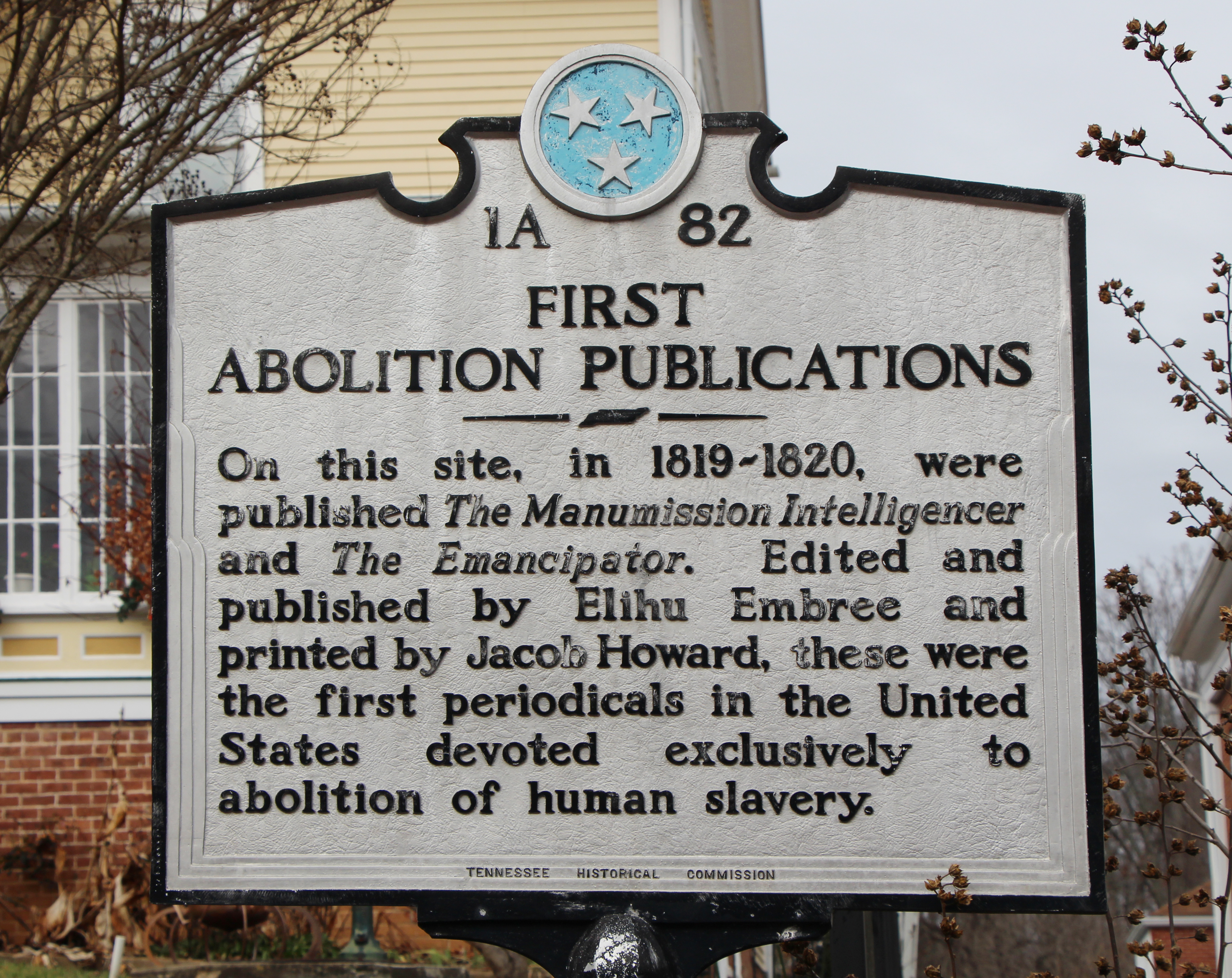
Manumission Plaque

Old Deadrick House
Also known as Poplar Hill, it is now known as the Thatcher Residence. The style of the building is Gothic Revival. The building is two stories and has an irregular shape (the floor plan is in the form of a cross with a steep gabled half octagon two-story front bay). The building has 6/6 windows. The foundation is brick and the siding is brick.

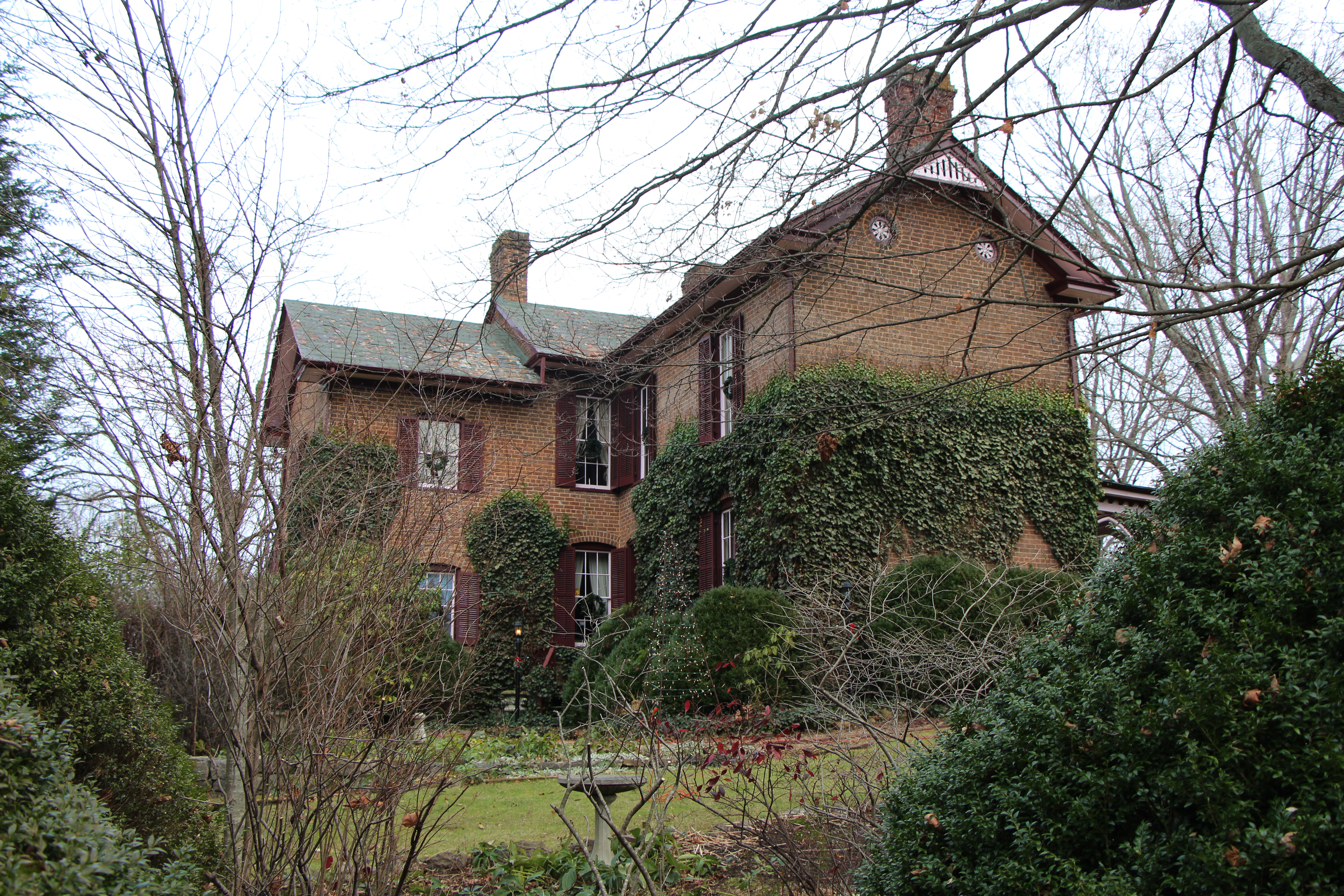
Old Deadrick House, 102 N. Cherokee, built 1878

Residential House
The style of the building has Italianate and Queen Anne influences. The building is two stories and has an irregular shape (with two-story octagonal bay on front and rectangular bay on the side). The foundation is brick and the siding is brick. The porch is on all four sides of an octagonal bay with a section that wraps right and which is glassed in. Ornamentation on the house consists of sawn brackets, sawn woodwork in starburst patterns in porch gable and over windows, chamfered columns and sawn wood arches, and small brick arches over windows.

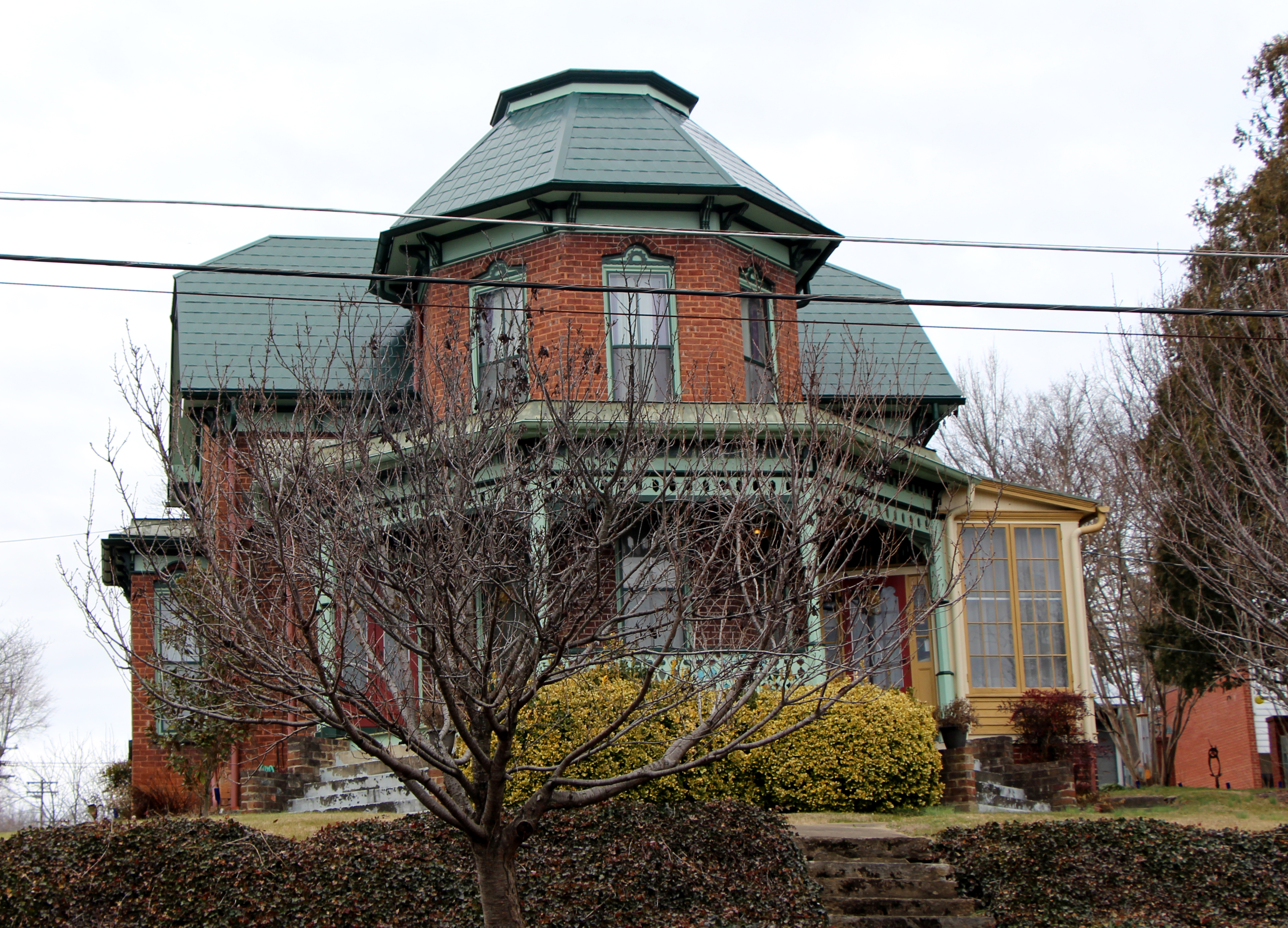
Residential House, 314 W. Main Street, built c. late 1860s with Italianate and Queen Anne influences

Hacker House
The style of the building has Italianate and Queen Anne influences. The building is two stories and has an irregular shape. The foundation is brick and the siding is brick. Heavy metal drip moldings over openings, shallow segmental arched windows, bay windows with dentils and brackets, sawn porch woodwork and brackets are ornamental features.

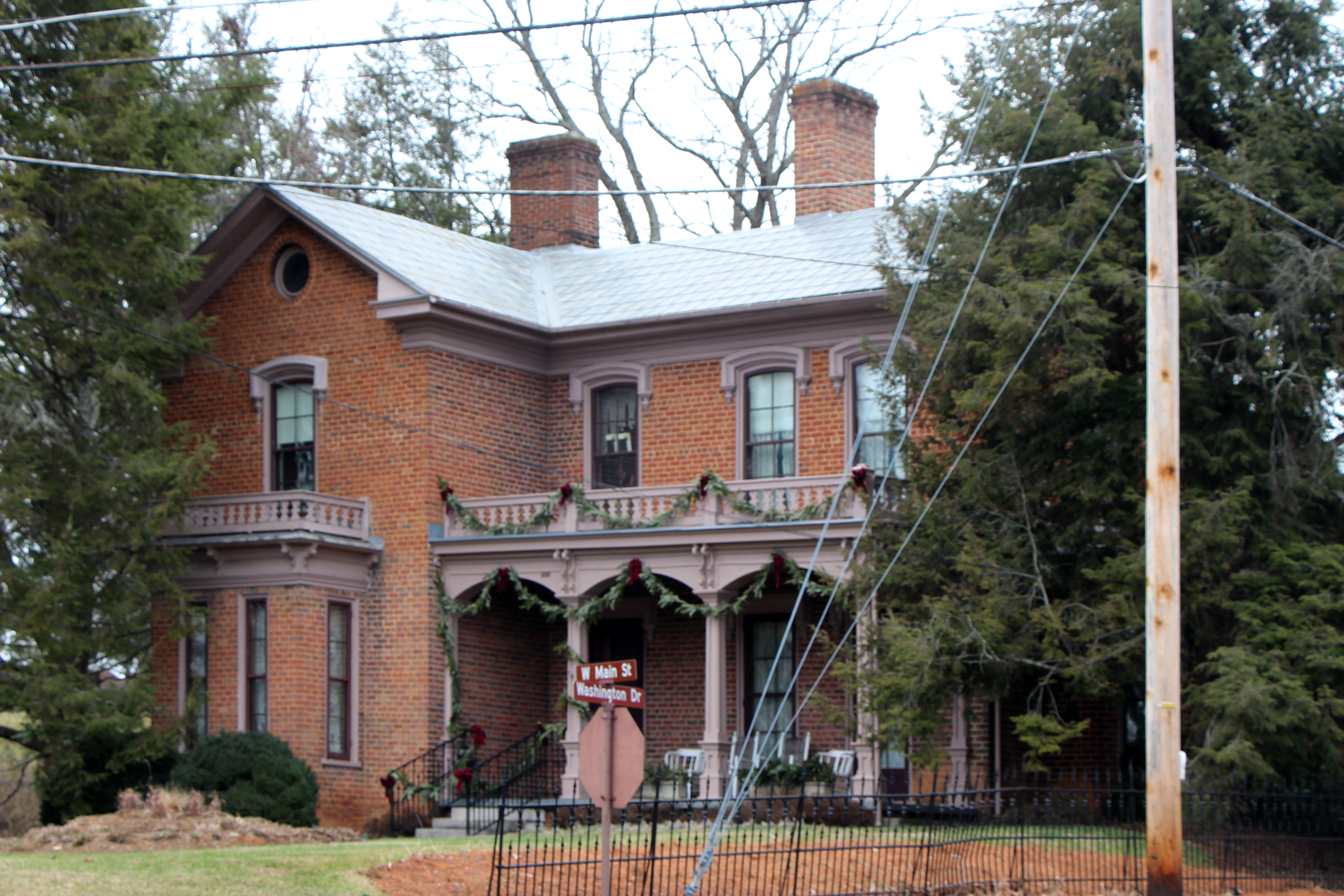
Hacker House, 400 W. Main Street, built 1869

=== Post-Victorian/Neoclassical period/Classical Revival ===
Washington County Courthouse
The current building is on the site of the first courthouse built in Washington County, in 1779. Its form is Classical Revival. The building is two and one half stories and has an irregular shape. The foundation is concrete and the siding is brick. The Classical Revival style porches have Ionic columns.

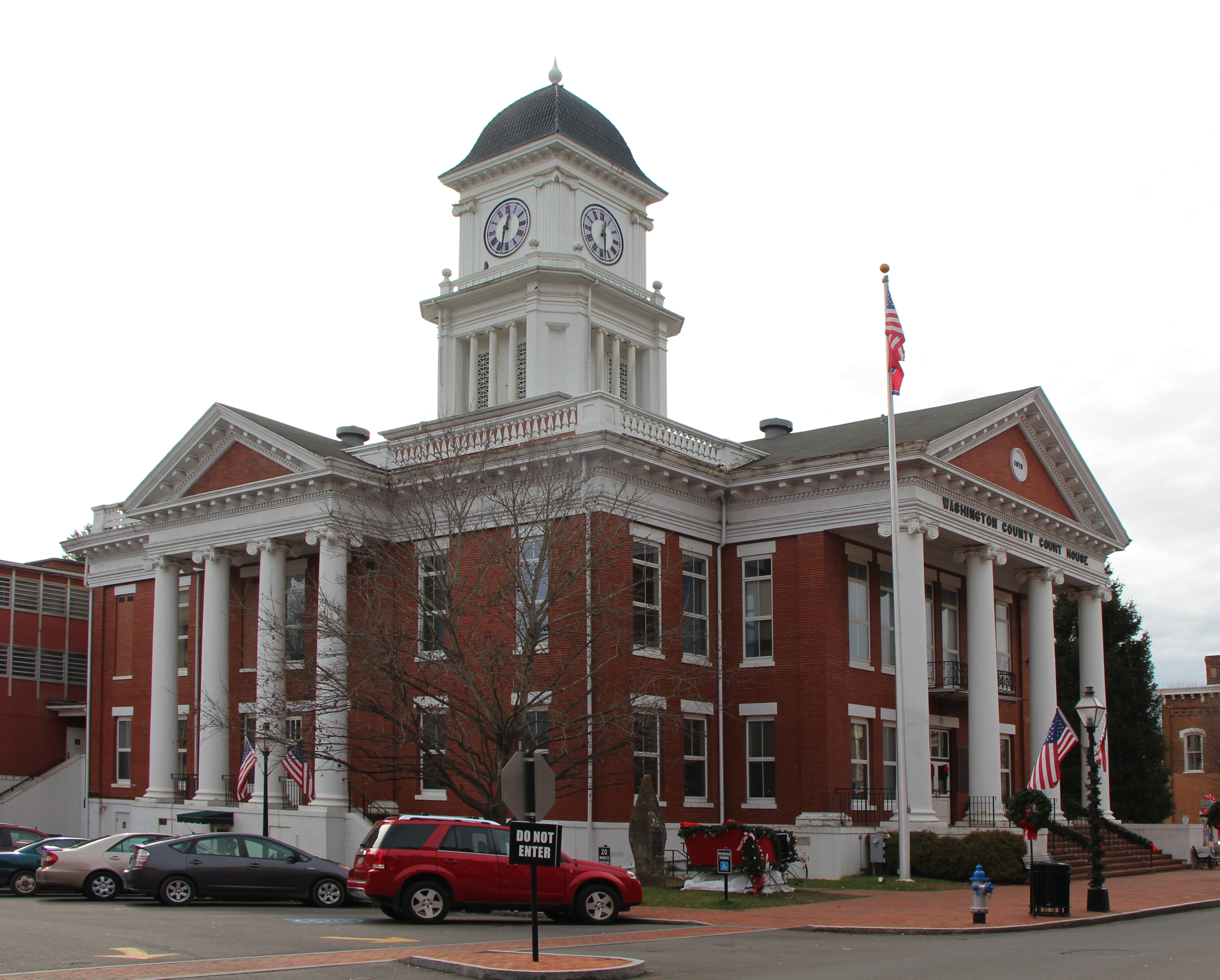
Washington County Courthouse, 100 Courthouse Square, built 1913

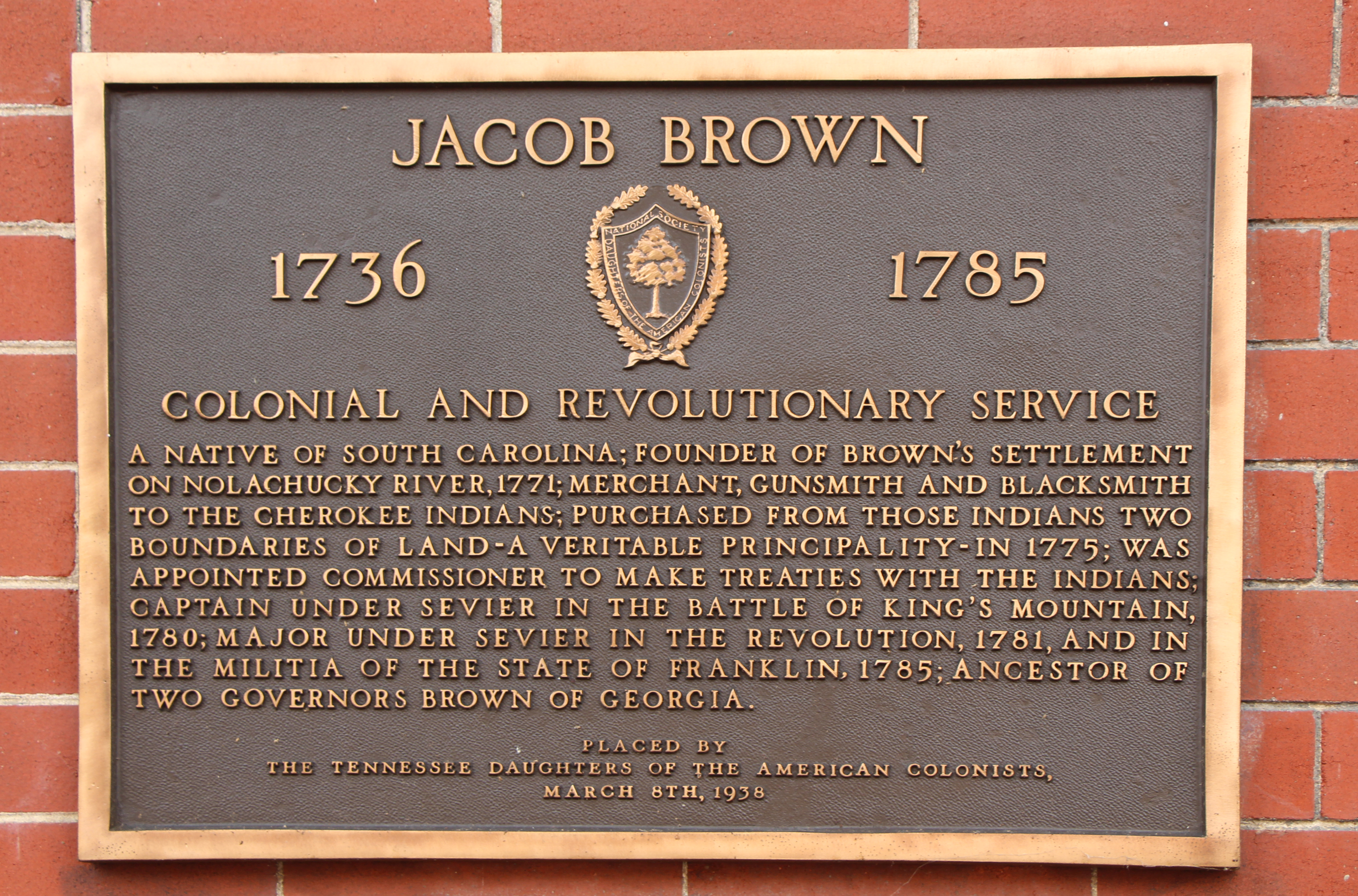
Washington County Courthouse Plaque

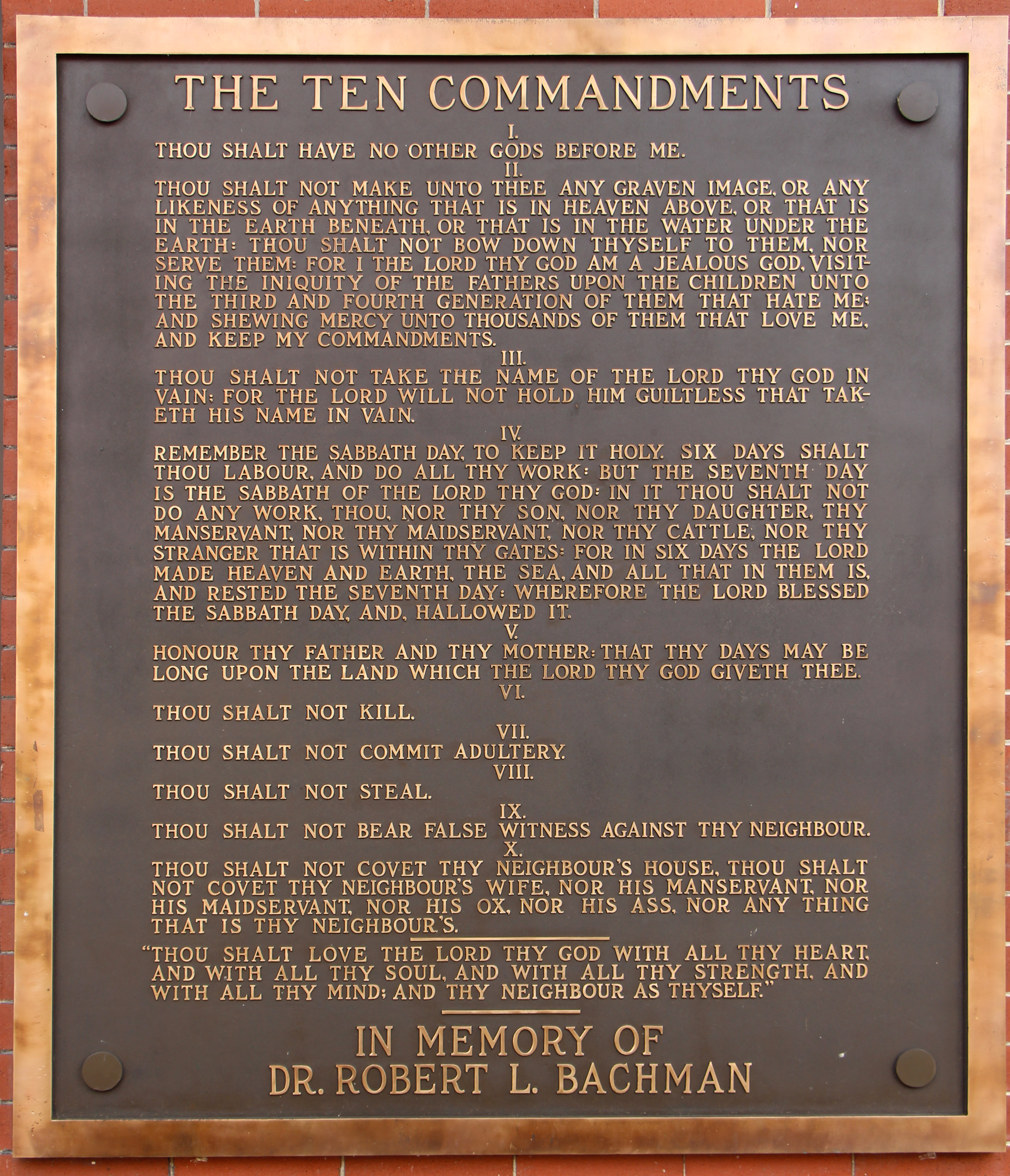
Washington County Courthouse Plaque

Academy Hill
Originally the Old Jonesboro High School, it was converted to condominiums. The style is Classical Revival. The building has three levels and a rectangular shape. The foundation is concrete and the siding is brick. The portico covers the front center and has classical columns. The building has 6/6 windows.

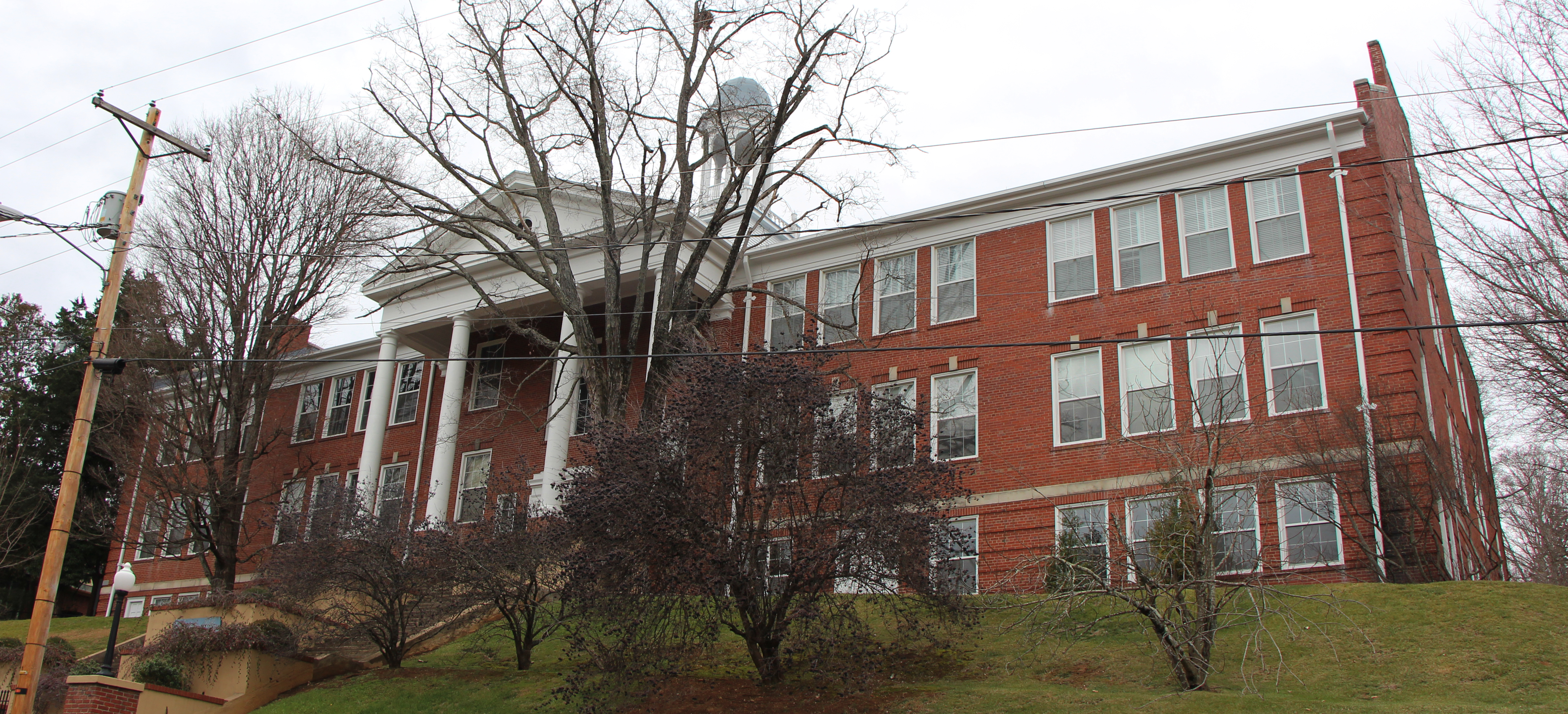
Academy Hill, 312 W. Main Street, built 1926

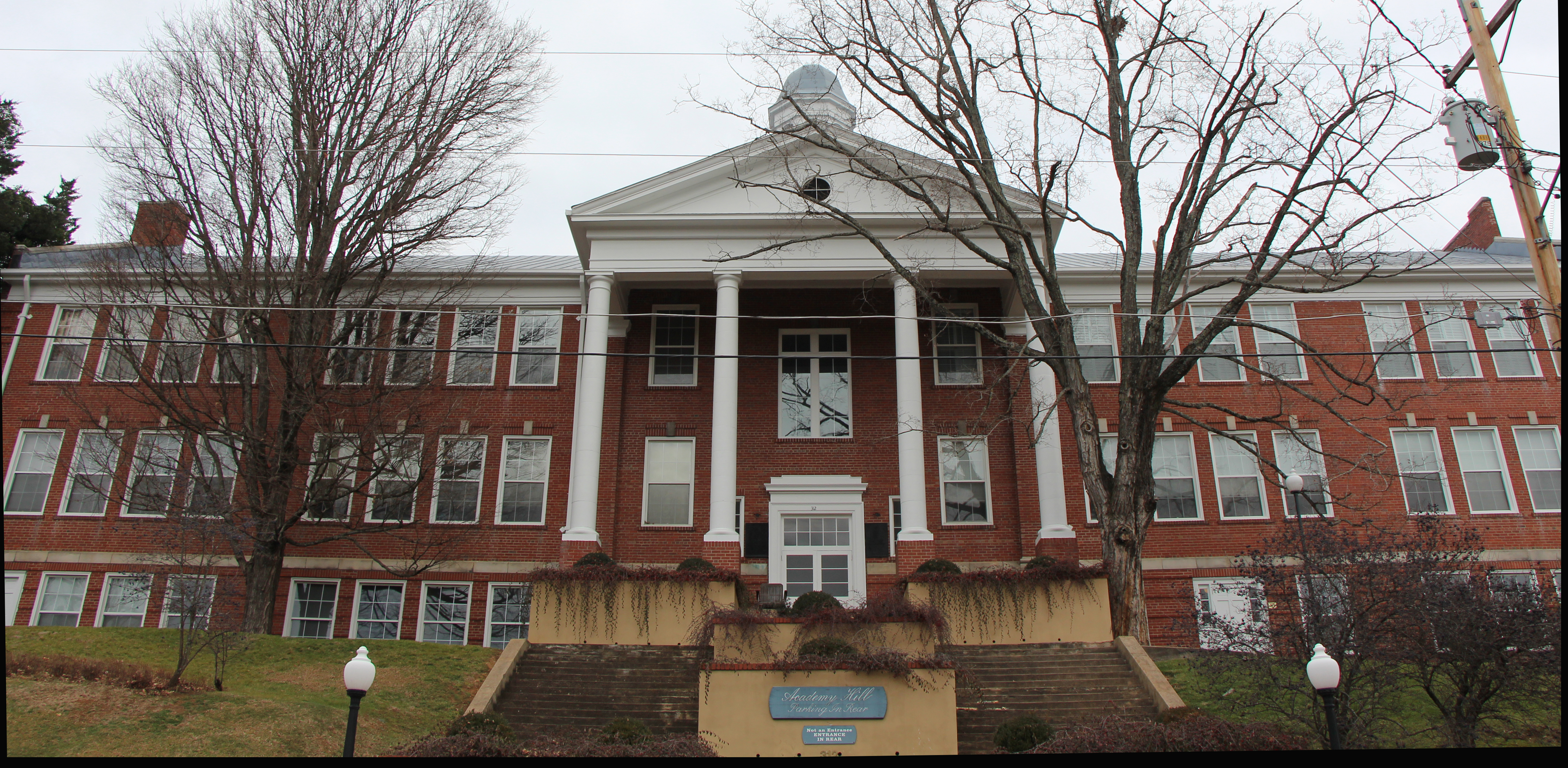
Academy Hill, facing north

=== Bungalow ===
Residential House
The building is one and one-half stories and has a square shape. The foundation is brick and the siding is brick.

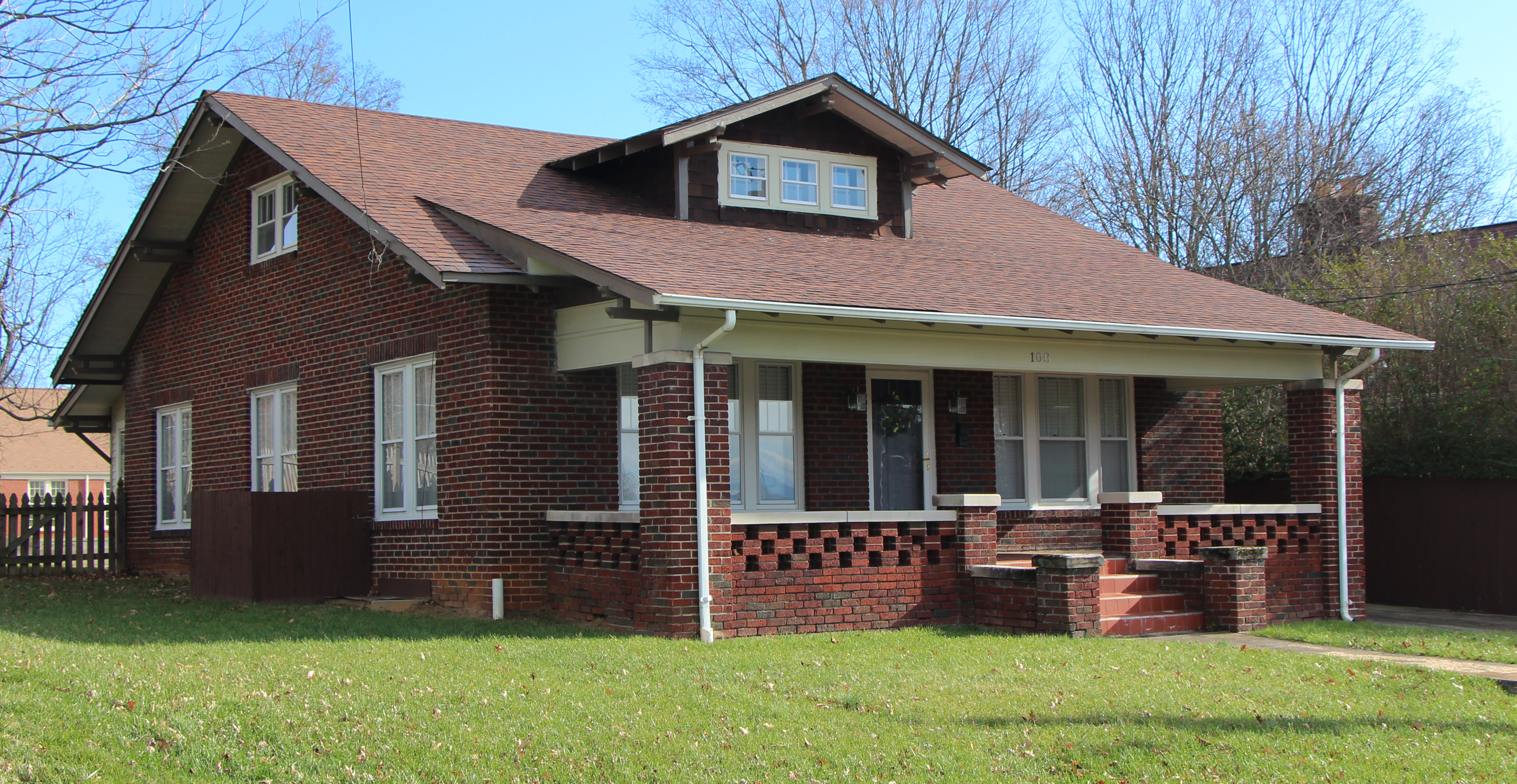
Old Clyde Haws House, 108 Oak Grove Ave, built 1933

Residential House
The building is one and one-half stories and has a square shape. The foundation is brick and the siding is asbestos shingle.

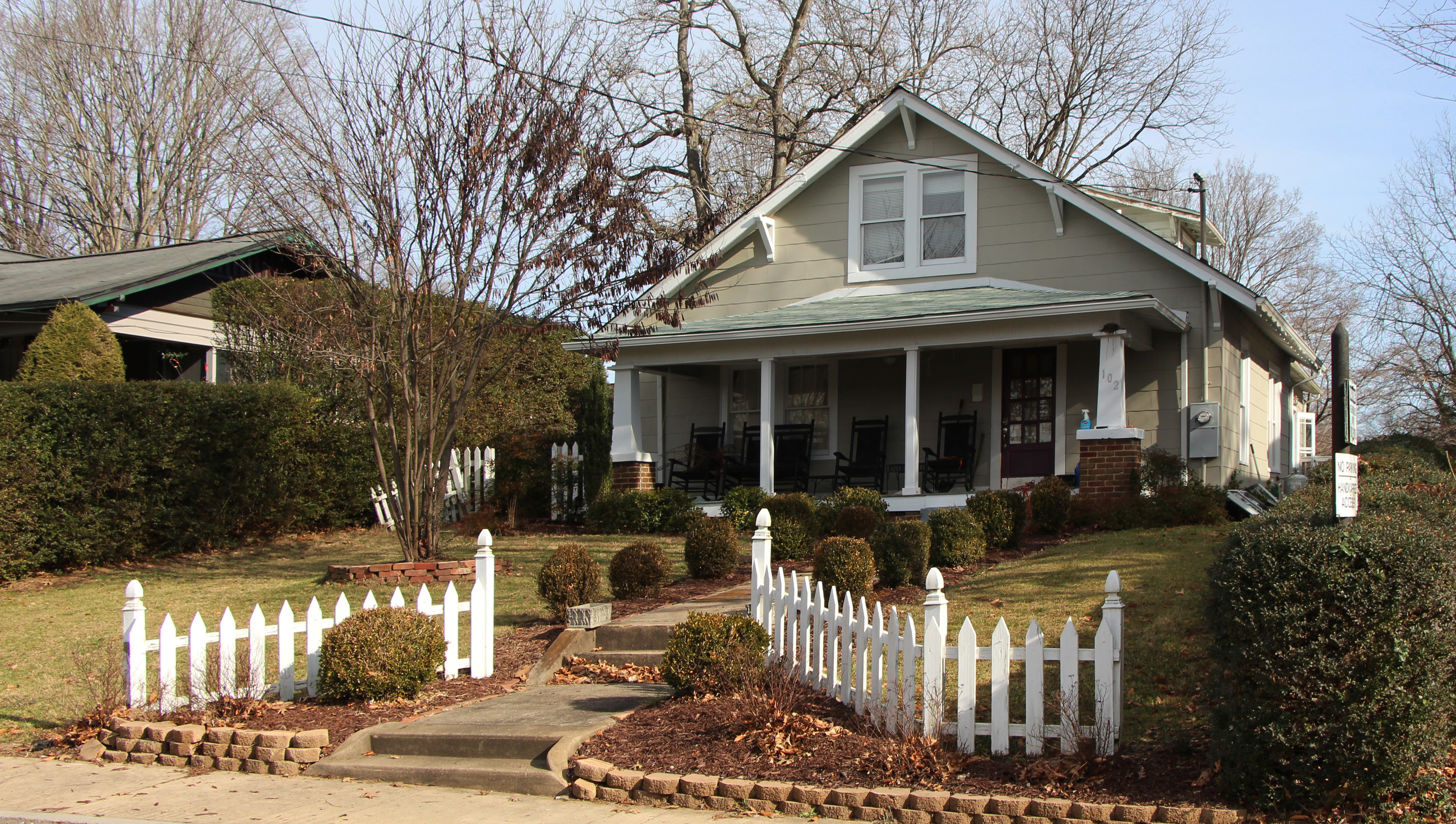
Residential House, 102 Oak Grove Avenue, built c. 1920

=== Minimal Traditional ===
Residential Buildings
The form of the buildings are I-house with Greek Revival influences. The buildings are two stories. The foundation is brick and the siding is weatherboard.

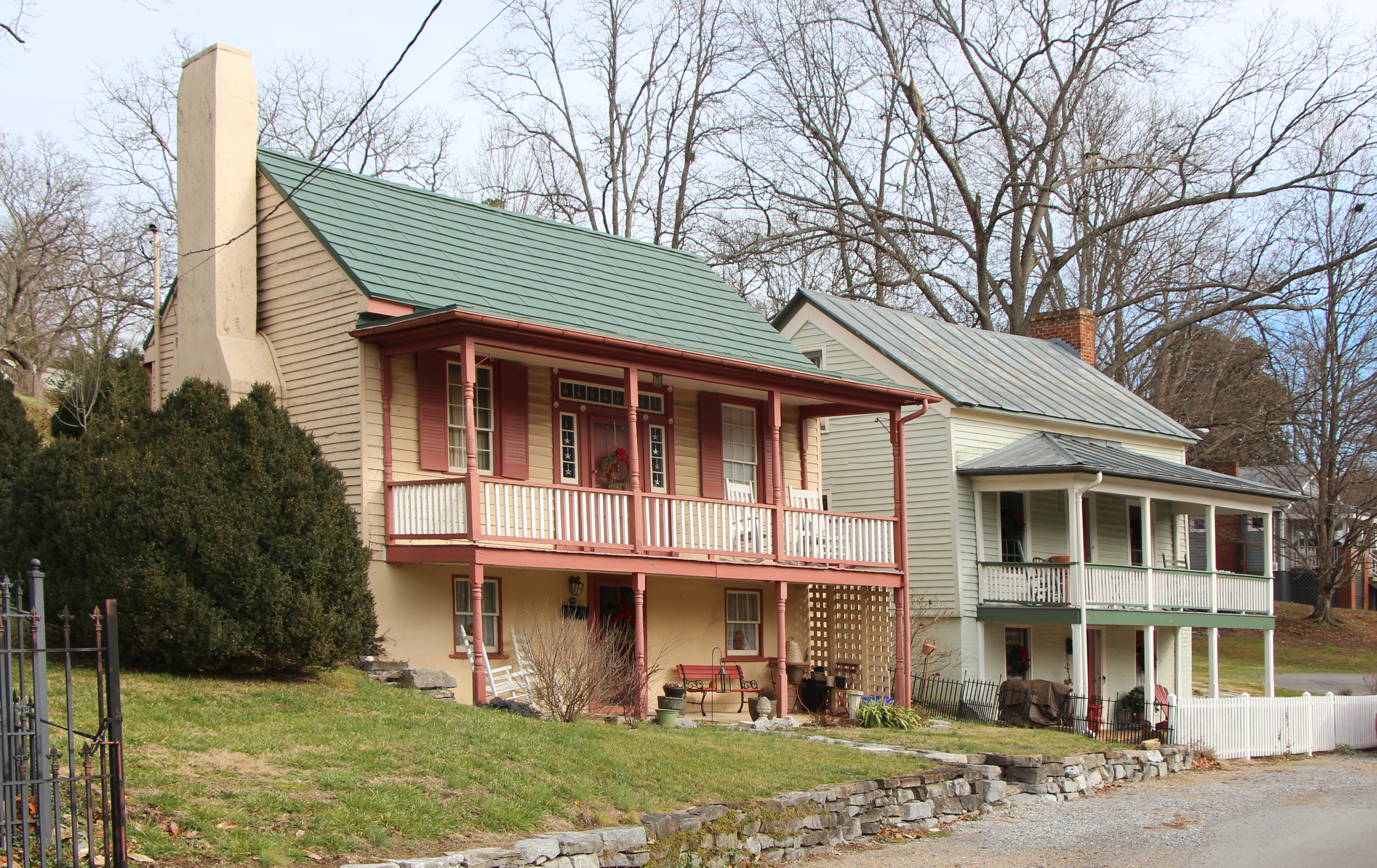
Residential Buildings, 105/107 Spring Street, built c. 1850 with Greek Revival influences

=== Other architectural styles ===
Mail Pouch Building
The building is two stories and has a rectangular shape. The foundation is brick and the siding is brick. The painted advertisement is from the early 1900s. The present façade is 1920s textured brick.

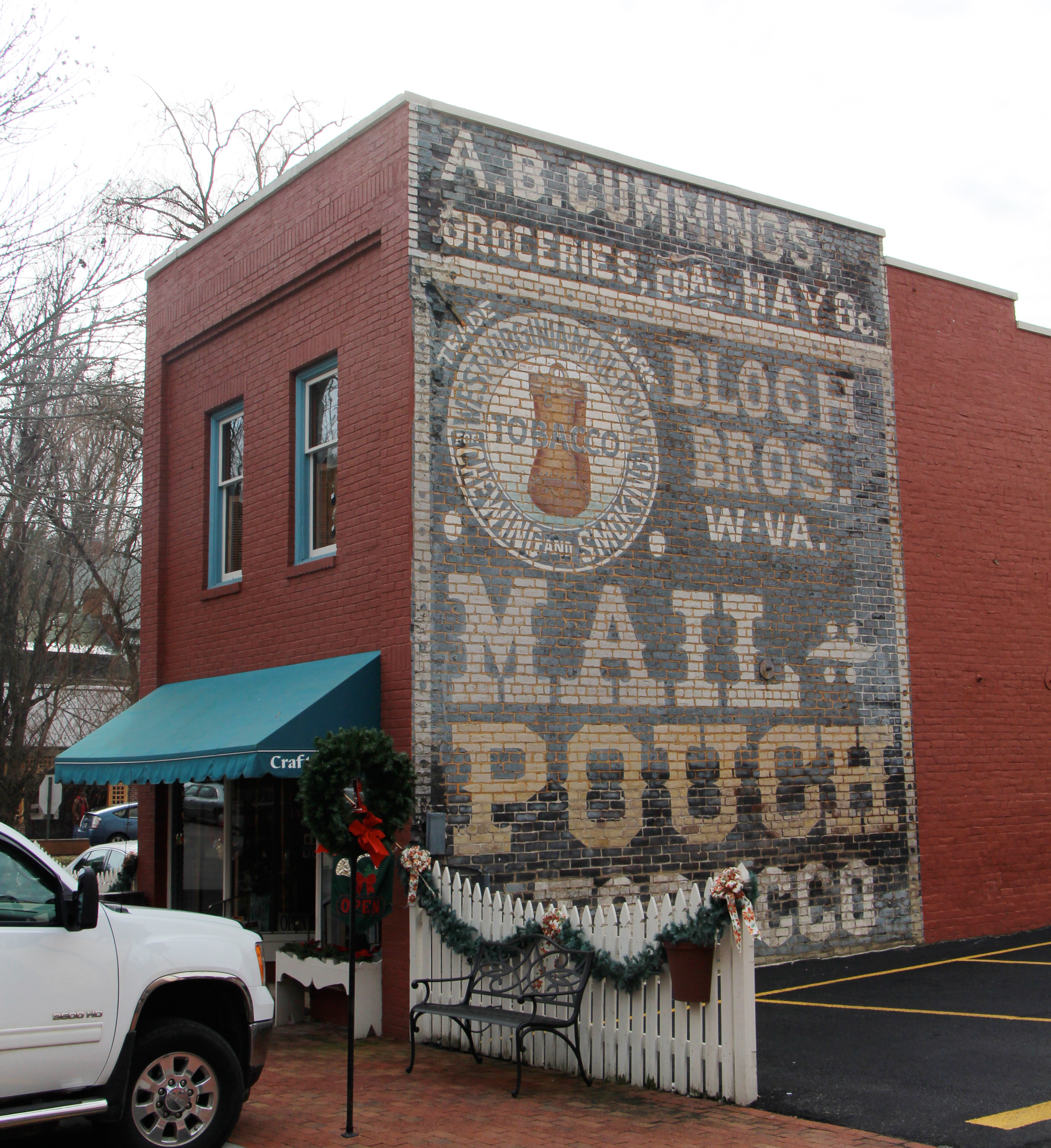
Mail Pouch Building, 104 S. Cherokee Street, built 1888; architecture is two-part commercial block

Christopher Taylor House
Built in 1777, the log house was moved from its original site to this location in the 1970s. It is two stories. The foundation is stone and the siding is log.

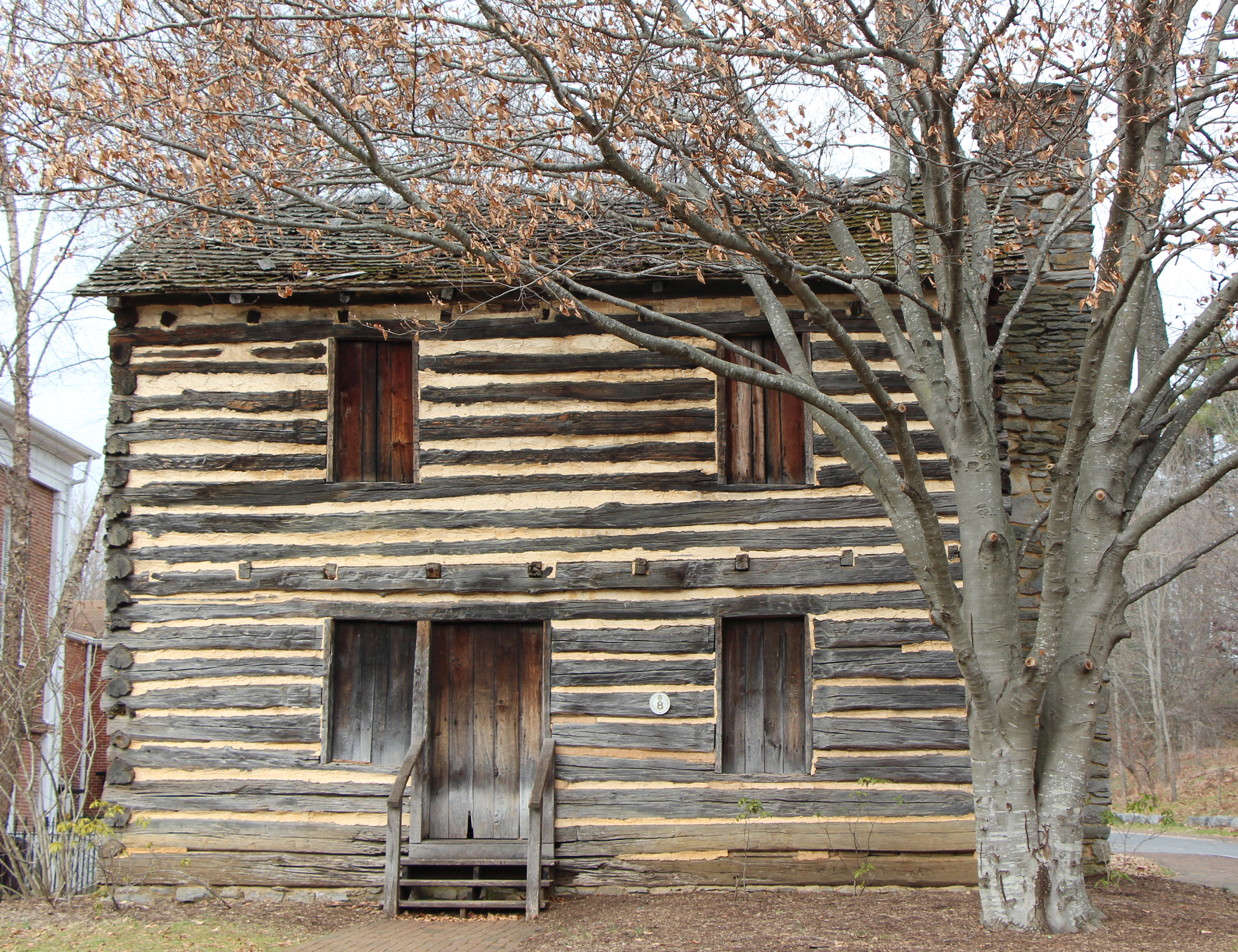
Christopher Taylor House, 118 Main Street, built c. 1778; log cabin

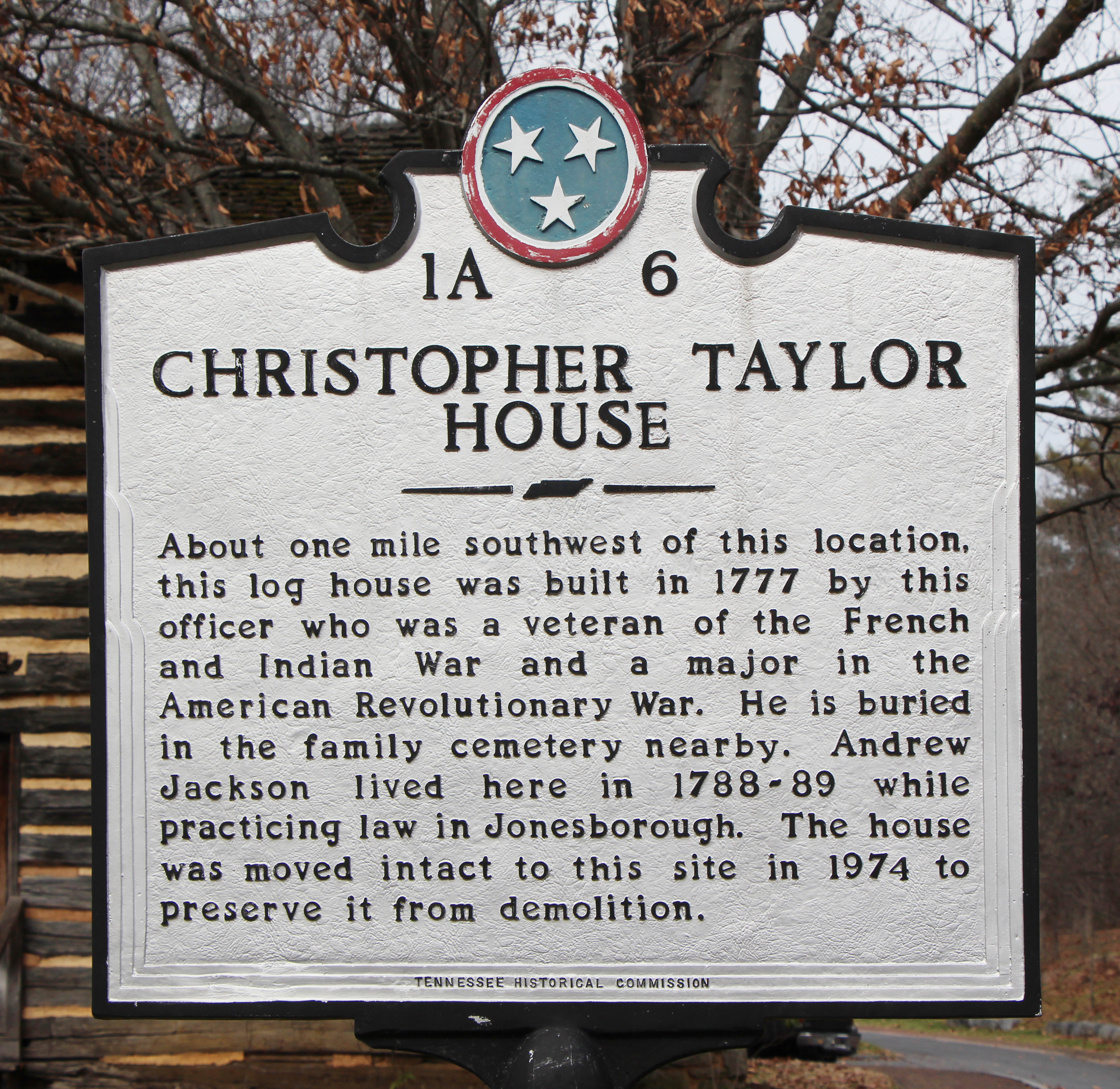
Christopher Taylor Plaque
