= Elijah (given name) =

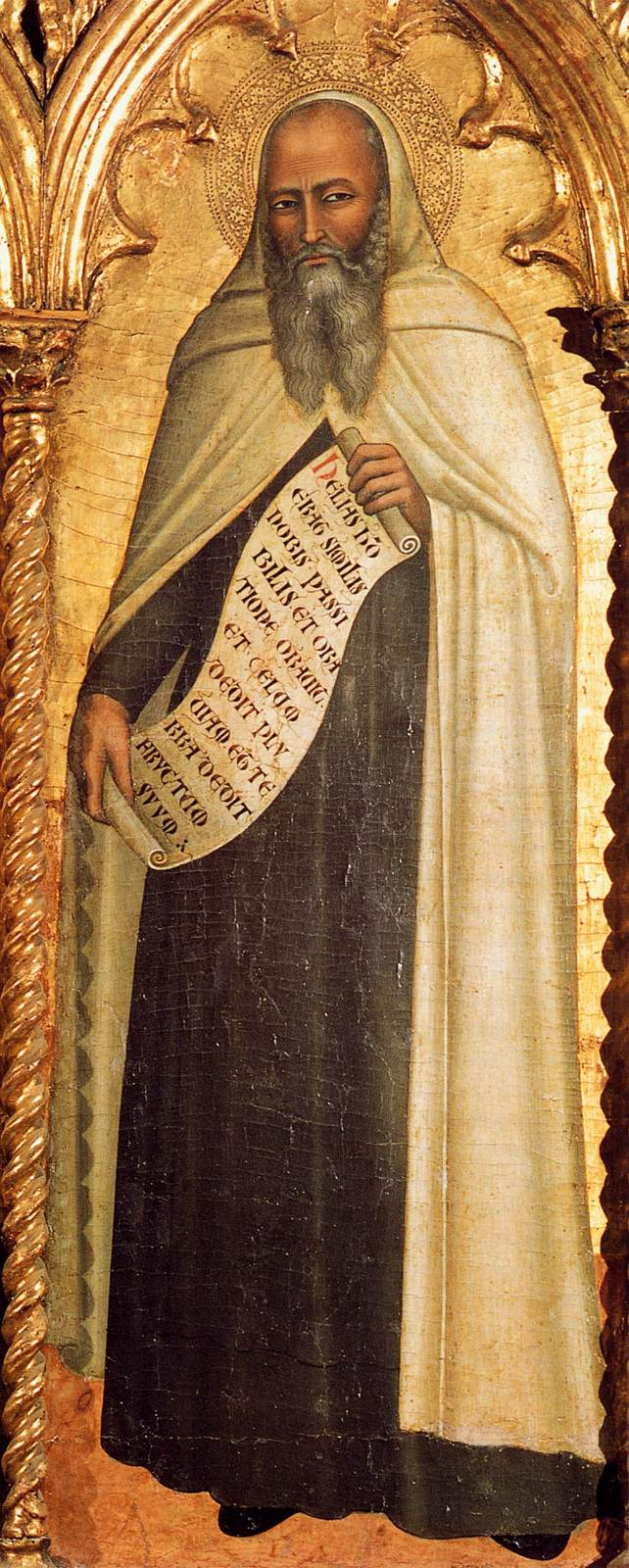
- Elijah
- Pronunciation: /ɪˈlaɪdʒə/ il-EYE-jə
- Gender: Male
- Language: Hebrew, English

Origin
- Origin: Hebrew
- Meaning: My God is Yahweh/YHWH

Other names
- Variant form: Elias
- Nickname: Eli
- Related names: Elihu, Elliott

Elijah (Hebrew: אֵלִיָּהוּ, romanized: Eliyahu, meaning "My God is Yahweh/YHWH") is a masculine given name after the prophet Elijah in the Hebrew Bible. Elijah was among the five most popular names for Black newborn boys in the American state of Virginia in 2022 and again in 2023. In 2022, it was the 37th-most popular name given to boys in Canada.

== Elijah in other languages ==
- Arabic: إليشا (Iilisha)
- Aramaic: ܐܠܝܐ (Elia)
- Albanian: Elia
- Amharic: ኢሊያ (īlīya)
- Armenian: Եղիա (Yeghia)
- Azerbaijani: İlyas
- Bengali: ইলিয়াস (Iliẏāsa)
- Bulgarian: Илия (Iliya)
- Burmese: ။ လိယ (. li y)
- Chinese Simplified: 以利亚 (Yǐ lì yǎ)
- Chinese Traditional: 以利亞 (Yǐ lì yǎ)
- Croatian: Ilija
- Czech: Elijah
- Danish: Elijah
- Dutch: Elijah
- English: Elijah
- Esperanto: Elijah
- Estonian: Eelija
- Filipino: Elijah
- Finnish: Elia
- French: Elijah
- German: Elia
- Greek: Ελιτζά (Elitzá)
- Gujarati: ઇલીજા (Ilījā)
- Hebrew: אליהו
- Hindi: एलिजा (Elija)
- Hungarian: Illés
- Icelandic: Elía
- Indonesian: Elia, Elijah, Ilyas
- Irish: Éilias
- Italian: Elia
- Japanese: エリヤ (Eriya)
- Javanese: Elijah
- Kannada: ಎಲಿಜಾ (Elijā)
- Kazakh: Ілияс
- Korean: 엘리야 (Elliya)
- Kurdish: Ijlyas
- Lao: ເອລີຢາ (Eliya) (Eliyaeliya)
- Latin: tulitque Helias
- Latvian: Elija
- Lithuanian: Elijas
- Macedonian: елија (Elija)
- Malagasy: Elia
- Malay: Elijah, Ilyas
- Malayalam: ഏലിയാ (ēliyā)
- Marathi: इलिजा (Ilija)
- Mongolian: динах (Dynakh)
- Nepali: Elija
- Norwegian: Elias
- Persian: الیا
- Polish: Eljasz
- Portuguese: Elias
- Punjabi: ਅਲੀਜਾ (Alījā)
- Romanian: Ilie
- Russian: Илья (Iliya)
- Serbian: елијах (Elijah)
- Slovenian: Elija
- Spanish: Elías
- Sundanese: Elijah
- Swedish: Elias
- Tajik: элита (Elita)
- Tamil: எலியா (Eliyā)
- Telugu: ఎలిజా (Elijā)
- Thai: เอลียาห์ (Xelīyāh̄̒)
- Turkish: İlyas
- Ukrainian: Ілля́ (Illya)
- Urdu: الیاجہ
- Uzbek: Eliya
- Vietnamese: Elijah
- Welsh: Elias

Notable people or fictional characters with the given name include:

== A ==
- Elijah Abel (1808–1884), American religious figure
- Elijah Abina (born 1935), Nigerian pastor
- Elijah Amoo Addo (born 1990), Ghanaian chef
- Elijah Adebayo (born 1998), English footballer
- Elijah Adekugbe (born 1996), English footballer
- Elijah Adlow (1896–1982), American politician
- Elijah Omolo Agar, Kenyan politician
- Elijah Alejo (born 2004), Filipino actress
- Elijah Malok Aleng (1937–2014), South Sudanese politician
- Elijah Alfandari, Turkish rabbi
- Elijah Allan-Blitz (born 1987), American actor
- Elijah Blue Allman (born 1976), American singer
- Elijah Allsopp (1877–1958), English footballer
- Elijah Amo (born 1999), American soccer player
- Elijah Anderson (disambiguation)
- Elijah Ari (born 1987), Ghanaian-Kyrgyz footballer
- Elijah Arroyo (born 2003), American football player
- Elijah Ateka (born 1972), Kenyan professor
- Elijah Ayolabi, Nigerian geophysicist

== B ==
- Elijah Babbitt (1795–1887), American politician
- Elijah W. Bacon (1836–1864), American soldier
- Elijhah Badger (born 2001), American football player
- Elijah Baker (actor) (born 1991), English actor
- Elijah Baker (preacher) (1742–1798), American minister
- Elijah Baldwin, American politician
- Elijah Barayi (1930–1994), South African trade unionist
- Elijah Porter Barrows (1807–1888), American clergyman
- Elijah Bashyazi (1420–1490), Turkish mathematician
- Elijah Behnke (born 1983), American politician
- Elijah Benamozegh (1823–1900), Italian rabbi
- Elijah Bentley, Canadian minister
- Elijah Benton (born 1996), American football player
- Elijah Boardman (1760–1823), American politician
- Elijah Boothe, American actor
- Elijah Coleman Bridgman (1801–1861), American missionary
- Elijah A. Briggs (1843–1922), American soldier
- Elijah Brigham (1751–1816), American politician
- Elijah Bristow (1788–1872), American settler
- Elijah V. Brookshire (1856–1936), American politician
- Elijah Brown, Canadian dancer
- Elijah Brush (1773–1813), American lawyer and politician
- Elijah Bryant (born 1995), American basketball player
- Elijah Burke (born 1978), American wrestler

== C ==
- Elijah Cadman (1843–1927), American religious figure
- Elijah Campbell (born 1995), American football player
- Elijah Canlas (born 2000), Filipino actor
- Elijah Capsali (1485–1550), Turkish mathematician
- Elijah Carey (1876–1916), New Zealand trade unionist
- Elijah Carrington (1914–1998), English cricketer
- Elijah Webb Chastain (1813–1874), American politician
- Elijah Chatman (born 2000), American football player
- Elijah Childs (born 1999), American basketball player
- Elijah Churchill (1755–1841), American general
- Elijah Clarance (born 1998), Swedish basketball player
- Elijah Clarke (1742–1799), American military officer
- Elijah Clarke (fighter), American kickboxer
- Elijah Cobb (1769–1848), American captain
- Elijah Collins (born 2000), American football player
- Elijah Combs (1770–1855), American politician
- Elijah Connor (born 1990), American singer-songwriter
- Elijah Cook (1835–??), American slave
- Elijah Fox Cook (1805–1886), American politician
- Elijah Cooks (born 1998), American football player
- Elijah Corlet (1610–1687), English schoolmaster
- Elijah Albert Cox (1876–1955), British painter
- Elijah Craig (1738–1808), American preacher
- Elijah Crane (1754–1834), American farmer
- Elijah Cresswell (1889–1931), Scottish footballer
- Elijah Cummings (1951–2019), American politician

== D ==
- Elijah Daniel (born 1994), American comedian
- Elijah Dart (1880–1954), English footballer
- Elijah L. Daughtridge (1863–1921), American politician
- Elijah Dixon (1790–1876), English businessman
- Elijah Dixon-Bonner (born 2001), English footballer
- Elijah Dotson (born 1999), American football player
- Elijah Dukes (born 1984), American baseball player

== E ==
- Elijah Easton (1815–1905), American farmer
- Elijah Erkloo, Canadian politician

== F ==
- Elijah Fenton (1683–1730), English poet
- Elijah Fields (born 1988), American football player
- Elijah Fisher (born 2004), Canadian basketball player
- Elijah Fletcher (1789–1858), American businessman

== G ==
- Elijah Garcia (born 1998), American football player
- Elijah Gates (1827–1915), American politician
- Elijah ben Moses Gershon Zahalon, Polish mathematician
- Elijah M. K. Glenn (1807–1870), American politician
- Elijah S. Grammer (1868–1936), American businessman and politician
- Elijah Dix Green (1799–1867), American merchant

== H ==
- Elijah Haahr (born 1982), American politician
- Elijah ben Joseph Habillo, Spanish philosopher
- Elijah Haines (1822–1889), American politician
- Elijah Hall (athlete) (born 1994), American sprinter
- Elijah Hallam (1848–1922), British miner
- Elijah Hamlin (1800–1872), American politician
- Elijah Harper (1949–2013), Canadian politician
- Elijah Carson Hart (1857–1929), American attorney
- Elijah Hayward (1786–1864), American lawyer
- Elijah ben Menahem HaZaken (980–1060), French poet
- Elijah Hedding (1780–1852), American bishop
- Elijah Herring, American football player
- Elijah Hicks (born 1999), American football player
- Elijah Higgins (born 2000), American football player
- Elijah Hirsh (born 1997), American-Israeli basketball player
- Elijah Hise (1802–1867), American diplomat
- Elijah Hollands (born 2002), Australian rules footballer
- Elijah Holyfield (born 1998), American football player
- Elijah Hood (born 1996), American football player
- Elijah Hoole (1798–1872), English missionary
- Elijah Hoole (architect) (1837–1912), English architect
- Elijah Horowitz-Winograd (1842–1878), Polish-Belarusian rabbi
- Elijah Embree Hoss (1849–1919), American bishop
- Elijah Howarth (1858–1938), English curator
- Elijah Hughes (born 1998), American basketball player
- Elijah Baldwin Huntington (1816–1877), American minister
- Elijah C. Hutchinson (1855–1932), American politician

== I ==
- Elijah Iles (1796–1883), American businessman
- Elijah Isaacs (1730–1799), American farmer

== J ==
- Elijah Jackson (born 2001), American football player
- Elijah Johnson (disambiguation)
- Elijah Jones (baseball) (1882–1943), American baseball player
- Elijah Jones (American football) (born 2000), American football player
- Elijah Joy (born 1982), American singer
- Elijah Juckett (1760–1839), American soldier
- Elijah Just (born 2000), New Zealand footballer

== K ==
- Elijah Kelley (born 1986), American actor
- Elijah Kellogg (1813–1901), American minister
- Elijah Kemboi (born 1984), Kenyan runner
- Elijah Kipterege (born 1987), Kenyan runner
- Elijah Klein (born 2000), American football player
- Elijah Krahn (born 2003), German footballer
- Elijah Kururia (born 1987), Kenyan MP

== L ==
- Elijah Lagat (1966–2025), Kenyan long-distance runner
- Elijah Landsofer (??–1702), Czech rabbi
- Lee Elijah (born 1990), South Korean actress
- Elijah Lee (born 1996), American football player
- Elijah Leonard (1814–1891), Canadian businessman
- Elijah B. Lewis (1854–1920), American politician
- Elijah Lidonde, Kenyan footballer
- Elijah Lim (born 2001), Singaporean footballer
- Elijah Litana (born 1970), Zambian footballer
- Elijah Loans (1555–1636), German rabbi
- Elijah Parish Lovejoy (1802–1837), American religious figure

== M ==
- Elijah 'Tap Tap' Makhatini (born 1942), South African boxer
- Elijah Manangoi (born 1993), Kenyan runner
- Elijah P. Marrs (1840–1910), American minister
- Elijah Martin (born 1996), American soccer player
- Elijah Martindale (1793–1874), American pioneer
- Elijah Masinde (1910/1912–1987), Kenyan activist
- Elijah McCall (born 1988), American boxer
- Elijah McClain (1996–2019), American social figure
- Elijah McClanahan (1770–1857), American soldier
- Elijah McCoy (1844–1929), Canadian-American inventor
- Elijah M. McGee (1819–1873), American politician
- Elijah McGuire (born 1994), American football player
- Elijah Mckenzie-Jackson (born 2003), British activist
- Elijah Mdolomba, South African politician
- Elijah Miles (1753–1831), Canadian farmer
- Elijah Miller (1772–1851), American judge
- Elijah Millgram (born 1958), American philosopher
- Elijah H. Mills (1776–1829), American politician
- Elijah Millsap (born 1987), American basketball player
- Elijah Mitchell (born 1998), American football player
- Elijah Mitchell (soccer) (born 2003), Bahamian footballer
- Elijah Mitrou-Long (born 1996), Canadian-Greek basketball player
- Elijah Mizrachi (1455–1525/1526), Turkish mathematician
- Elijah Molden (born 1999), American football player
- Elijah Monoky, Hungarian noble
- Elijah Montalto (1567–1616), French physician
- Elijah Moore (born 2000), American football player
- Elijah A. Morse (1841–1898), American politician
- Elijah Moshinsky (1946–2021), Australian opera director
- Elijah Moulton (1820–1902), American settler
- Elijah Doro Muala (born 1960), Solomon Islander politician
- Elijah Mudenda (1927–2008), Zambian politician
- Elijah Muhammad (1897–1975), American religious leader
- Elijah Mushemeza (born 1964), Ugandan academic
- Elijah Mwangale (1939–2004), Kenyan politician
- Elijah E. Myers (1832–1909), American architect

== N ==
- Elijah Nevett (born 1944), American football player
- Elijah Ngurare (born 1970), Namibian politician
- Elijah Niko (born 1990), New Zealand rugby union footballer
- Elijah Nkala (born 1964), Zimbabwean sprinter
- Elijah Nkansah (born 1994), American football player
- Elijah Hise Norton (1821–1914), American politician

== O ==
- Elijah Obade (born 1991), American-Lebanese basketball player
- Elijah B. Odom (1859–1924), American physician
- Elijah Olaniyi (born 1999), American basketball player

== P ==
- Elijah Paige (born 2005), American football player
- Elijah Paine (1757–1842), American politician
- Elijah Parish (1762–1825), American clergyman
- Elijah F. Pennypacker (1804–1888), American abolitionist
- Elijah Phillips (1809–1832), American settler
- Elijah Phister (1822–1887), American politician
- Elijah Pierce (1892–1984), American wood carver
- Elijah Pierson (1786–1834), American businessman
- Elijah Pitts (1938–1998), American football player and coach
- Elijah Ponder (born 2002), American football player
- Elijah Barrett Prettyman (1830–1907), American academic administrator
- Elijah Pyle (1918–2009), English footballer

== Q ==
- Elijah Qualls (born 1995), American football player

== R ==
- Elijah Raridon (born 2004), American football player
- Elijah W. Reed (1827–1888), American fisherman
- Elijah Reichlin-Melnick (born 1984), American politician
- Elijah Rhoades (1791–1858), American politician
- Elijah Riley (born 1998), American football player
- Elijah Risley (1787–1870), American politician
- Elijah Roberts (born 2001), American football player
- Elijah Sterling Clack Robertson (1820–1879), American settler
- Elijah Frink Rockwell (1809–1888), American minister
- Elijah Round (1882–??), English footballer

== S ==
- Elijah Sandham (1875–1944), English politician
- Elijah Sarratt (born 2003), American football player
- Elijah Schik (1795–1876), Lithuanian rabbi
- Elijah Sells (1814–1897), American military officer
- Elijah Watt Sells (1858–1924), American accountant
- Elijah Seymour (born 1998), Caymanian footballer
- Elijah Mattison Sharp (1832–1891), American politician
- Elijah Shaw, American bodyguard
- Elijah B. Sherman (1832–1910), American lawyer
- Elijah Siegler, American professor
- Elijah Simmons (born 2001), American football player
- Elijah Smith (disambiguation)
- Elijah Sogomo (born 1954), Kenyan sprinter
- Elijah ben Solomon Abraham ha-Kohen (died 1729), Greek preacher
- Elijah Spencer (1775–1852), American politician
- Elijah Edmund Spencer (1846–1919), Canadian politician
- Elijah Spira (1660–1712), Czech rabbi
- Elijah Stansbury Jr. (1791–1883), American politician
- Elijah Steele (1817–1883), American attorney
- Elijah Stephens (1804–1887), American pioneer
- Elijah Stewart (born 1995), American basketball player
- Elijah B. Stoddard (1826–1903), American politician
- Elijah Sullivan (born 1997), American football player
- Elijah K. Sumbeiywo (??–2012), Kenyan politician

== T ==
- Elijah D. Taft (1819–1915), American army officer
- Elijah Tamboo (born 1993), Seychellois footballer
- Elijah Tana (born 1975), Zambian footballer
- Elijah Tau-Tolliver (born 2003), American football player
- Elijah Taylor (disambiguation)
- Elijah Thomas (born 1996), American basketball player
- Elijah Thurmon (born 1978), American football player
- Elijah Tillery (born 1957), American boxer
- Elijah Tsatas (born 2004), Australian footballer

== U ==
- Elijah E. Unger (1857–1903), American accountant

== V ==
- Elijah Vance (1801–1871), American politician

== W ==
- Elijah Wadsworth (1747–1817), American military officer
- Elijah Wald (born 1959), American guitarist
- Elijah Walton (1832–1880), British landscape painter
- Elijah Ward (1816–1882), American politician
- Elijah Ware (born 1983), Australian rules footballer
- Elijah Waring (1787–1857), English writer
- Elijah Wheatley (1885–1951), British jockey
- Elijah White (1806–1879), American missionary
- Elijah V. White (1832–1907), American general
- Elijah Wilkinson (born 1995), American football player
- Elijah Williams (disambiguation)
- Elijah Wilson (born 1995), American basketball player
- Elijah Nicholas Wilson (1842–1915), American pioneer
- Elijah Winnington (born 2000), Australian swimmer
- Elijah Benton Withers (1836–1898), American politician
- Elijah Wolfson, American writer
- Elijah Wood (born 1981), American actor
- Elijah Wood (murderer) (1878–1913), American serial killer
- Elijah Woods (politician) (1778–1820), American politician
- Elijah H. Workman (1835–1906), American agriculturalist
- Elijah Wynder (born 2003), American soccer player

== Fictional characters ==
- Elijah Baley, in the novel series Robot
- Elijah Kamski, from the video game Detroit: Become Human
- Elijah Mikaelson, in the television series The Vampire Diaries and its spin-off show The Originals
- Elijah Mundo, in the television series CSI: Cyber
- Father Elijah, from the video game Fallout: New Vegas

== See also ==
- Eliahu, a list of people with the given name or surname Eliahu or Eliyahu
