= Hallam (surname) =

Hallam is a surname. Notable people with the surname include:

- Albert Hallam (1869–1940), English cricketer
- Anthony Hallam (1933–2017), British palaeontologist
- Arthur Hallam, poet
- Charles Hallam, English footballer
- Chris Hallam (1962–2013), Welsh Paralympic athlete
- Sir Clement Thornton Hallam, Solicitor to the General Post Office
- Clint Hallam, the first hand transplant recipient
- David Hallam, Member of the European Parliament
- Elijah Hallam, miner
- Farai Hallam, English football referee
- Graeme Hallam, English cricketer
- Harry Hallam, English football manager
- Henry Hallam, English actor
- Henry Hallam, English historian
- Ian Hallam, British cyclist
- Jack Hallam, former Australian politician
- Jack Hallam, professional footballer
- Jennie Hallam-Peel, British debutante and chairwoman of the Queen Charlotte's Ball
- John Hallam (disambiguation), several people
- Jordan Hallam, English footballer
- Lewis Hallam Jr, England-born American theatre manager
- Maurice Hallam (1931–2000), English cricketer
- Norman Hallam, English footballer
- Norman Hallam, clarinetist and composer
- Oscar Hallam, American lawyer, judge, and academic
- Robert Hallam, bishop
- Roger Hallam (disambiguation), list of people with the name
- Thomas Hallam (actor), British stage actor
- Thomas Hallam (cricketer), English cricketer
- Tracey Hallam, badminton player
- William and Lewis Hallam, who brought professional theatre to North America
- William Hallam, Bishop
- William Hallam, British trade unionist

== Fictional characters ==
- Aaron Hallam, a character in the 2003 movie The Hunted
- Archie Hallam, a character in the British soap Doctors
- Frederick Hallam, a character in the science fiction novel The Gods Themselves by Isaac Asimov
