= Elijah Pierson =

American businessman and preacher (1786–1834)

- Born: August 30, 1786; Morristown, New Jersey, U.S.
- Died: August 6, 1834 (aged 47); Sing Sing, New York, U.S.
- Cause of death: Poisoning (alleged)
- Occupations: Businessman; preacher
- Spouse: Sarah Stanford (m. 1822; died 1830)

Elijah Pierson (30 August 1786 – 6 August 1834) was a successful American businessman turned preacher who became known for his involvement with the religious leader Robert Matthews, sometimes called "The Prophet Matthias," and their housekeeper Isabella, later known as Sojourner Truth.

== Early life ==
Pierson was born in 1786 and raised in Morristown, New Jersey, in a religious Calvinist Presbyterian household. He was descended from Reverend Abraham Pierson, who led the Puritan migration from the New Haven Colony to Newark in 1666, and his family had been founding members of Morristown's First Presbyterian Church, where they were heavily involved, and his father served as trustee.

== Career ==
Sometime in the early 1800s, he moved to New York City and, in 1820, went into business with John Steinbrenner, opening a mercantile business on Pearl Street. The year before, he became a member of Gardiner Spring's Brick Presbyterian Church, which at the time was a center for evangelical lay missionary societies. One of the missionary societies, the Female Missionary Society for the Poor of New York and Its Vicinity, was looking for an elder for its mission church in the Bancker Street slum, and Pierson volunteered, assisting the pastor Elihu W. Baldwin. Pierson also began writing in favor of Christian perfectionism.

Pierson met Sarah Stanford, one of the Female Missionary Society missionaries and the daughter of John Stanford, a well-known and respected preacher and the chaplain of New York's charitable and penal institutions. They married in 1822, and Elijah Pierson left the Presbyterian church to join Sarah's Baptist church, where he served as a deacon. Soon, the two of them became involved with a perfectionist group led by a woman named Frances Folger.

Pierson applied for formal orders to become a Baptist preacher but was rejected; he then quit his Baptist church, organizing an independent perfectionist church with Folger in Bowery Hill in 1830. By then he had become "one of New York's best-known religious reformers" according to Paul E. Johnson and Sean Wilentz. Despite some of the group's unorthodox beliefs and practices, they maintained connections with mainstream evangelicals and continued ministry work such as constructing a school for poor children, and a mission to evangelize to the city's prostitutes, including in Five Points, a notorious slum. An asylum was set up as part of the Bowery Hill church to house the reformed prostitutes, and around this time a housekeeper and former slave named Isabella Van Wagenen, who would later become known as Sojourner Truth, joined the Bowery Hill church and became the Piersons housekeeper.

In 1830, after eight years of marriage, Sarah died from what was reported as overwork. Elijah Pierson thought he heard God say "Thou art Elijah the Tishbite" and believed he was to prepare the way for the Lord. He tried to heal Sarah before she died, and then once she died announced that he would raise her up. A small crowd of followers and spectators came along with a doctor, but Pierson failed to raise her. A minister, possibly Sarah's father, who was not impressed by his antics, then announced Sarah would indeed rise again at the resurrection and closed the proceedings.

Pierson returned to preaching to a dwindling number of followers, still under the name Elijah the Tishbite, but his evangelical friends slowly left him, and he lost much of his influence in missionary work. In May 1832 Robert Matthews, going by the name Matthias, came to see him.

=== Kingdom of Matthias ===
Pierson became devoted to Matthews after he heard that Matthews had dated the beginning of his Kingdom to the day Pierson had independently heard God give him his new name; Matthews responded that he had commissioned Pierson as Elijah the Tishbite on that day. After that point Pierson turned his pulpit over to Matthews the following Sunday, with a congregation of about 50 or 60 people, and became almost unrecognizable to old friends. In 1832 Pierson rented a house for Matthews, and gave him Isabella Van Wagenen as a servant; however at one point Pierson temporarily seemed to lose some faith in Matthews and cut off his allowance, so Matthews moved into a hotel and Van Wagenen found other work, but still helped with Matthews' laundry. Van Wagenen believed in Matthews, but only after Pierson who she trusted came to believe in him.

Pierson's old friends Benjamin and Ann Folger who lived in Sing Sing, New York came to visit him when they heard of what was going on. Over the next year Pierson and Matthews gradually convinced them that Matthews was legitimate, and that Christianity was evil and they should leave their old church, avoid prayer meetings, and join Matthews. Matthews moved into the Folger's home in Sing Sing, which he named Mount Zion, followed by Pierson and Van Wagenen. Matthews ruled as the absolute patriarch over the estate, where he designated chores and tasks for the residents of his Kingdom to complete.

== Death and aftermath ==
On July 28, 1834 in Sing Sing, New York, after eating several plates of blackberries, Pierson died of what was reported as poisoning. Robert Matthews, along with his housekeeper Isabella Van Wagenen (later known as Sojourner Truth), were accused of poisoning Pierson and the case became, according to Johnson and Wilentz, "one of the first penny-press sensations in American history". Matthews and Van Wagenen were acquitted due to lack of evidence, and Van Wagenen's presentation of several letters verifying her trustworthiness as a servant. The trial then focused on the reported beating of Matthews' daughter which he was found guilty of. The trial which lasted four days, resulted in a sentencing of three months and thirty additional days for contempt of court. Johnson and Wilentz also wrote that, based on the available evidence, they were "largely persuaded that no poisoning occurred."
