= Callam =

Callam is both a surname and a given name. Notable people with the name include:

- Dave Callam (born 1983), Scottish rugby union player
- Neville Callam, Jamaican Baptist theologian
- Callam Jones (born 1996), English footballer

== See also ==
- Callum
- Hallam (surname)
