= MacPherson Presbyterian Church =

Church in Fayetteville, NC, United States

- Location in the state of North Carolina

Religion
- Affiliation: Presbyterian Church USA
- Status: active

Location
- Location: Fayetteville, North Carolina, U.S.
- Coordinates: 35°03′38.6″N 78°56′44.1″W

Website
- www.macphersonchurch.com

MacPherson Presbyterian Church is a Presbyterian church in Fayetteville, North Carolina. MacPherson Presbyterian Church is a historic church at Cliffdale Rd and McPherson Church Rd. in Fayetteville, North Carolina. It was made part of the North Carolina Highway Historical Marker Program in 1939. Founded by early Scottish settlers and its cemetery contains the graves of Alexander MacPherson and T. H. Holmes, a Confederate general.

== History ==
MacPherson Presbyterian Church services began around 1793 at Blount's Creek (present-day Branson's Creek) in Cumberland County. It was formally established in the early 1800s by Scottish settlers in the area, and was named for Colin MacPherson, who donated the church's original lands. Rebuilt in the late 1860s, MacPherson Church is located on present-day Cliffdale Road in the Seventy-First Township.

In 1793 MacPherson's Meetinghouse members gathered informally under a shelter along the banks of Branson's Creek. The Reverend Angus McDiarmid, who also worked at other area Presbyterian churches including Barbecue and Bluff, preached irregularly at the gatherings. By 1800, the congregants appointed a committee to construct a permanent structure and to officially establish MacPherson Church.

The six-member committee decided to locate the permanent church building on five acres of land donated by Colin MacPherson, for whom the church was named. Eight elders were appointed to lead the new congregation, including Daniel Macrae, James Torry and Neill Buie, Sr. In 1801 a simple frame building was erected for the congregation. MacPherson Church continued to develop over the next few years, with guest preachers throughout the next fifty years. These included prominent Cumberland County figures like Reverend Colin McIver, a professor at Fayetteville Academy, and Reverend Simeon Colton, the first principal at Donaldson Academy.

In either 1852 or 1854, the Presbytery of North Carolina dissolved MacPherson Church, due to the lack of qualified preachers in Cumberland County. However, Sunday School was continued. In 1867, a petition with forty-three signatures was presented to the Presbytery for the reincorporation of MacPherson Church. Upon its reestablishment, Alexander MacPherson, who was made a deacon and who was eventually buried in the graveyard, donated seven acres of land to the church. In addition to MacPherson, Confederate Lieutenant General Theophilus Hunter Holmes, who served as commander of the Trans-Mississippi department for the Confederacy, is buried in the church's graveyard.

In the late 1860s a new sanctuary was constructed with bricks from the former Confederate Arsenal in Fayetteville. William T. Sherman and his army destroyed the arsenal during their march through the South in the spring of 1865. MacPherson Church has remained active since, and now thrives as a popular suburban church with significant activities in local, national and international missions. In 1998, MacPherson Church, under the leadership of former pastor Rev. James S. Welch Jr., established a church to church partnership with a congregation in Oryol, Russia. Two years later, in 2000, a MacPherson church family moved to Russia to become full-time missionaries working with church to church partnerships. Also in 2000, MacPherson celebrated its bicentennial with special events including the publishing of a church history, the building of a memorial cairn, and the purchase of a hospital van for Good Shepherd Hospital in the Republic of the Congo.
