= Mountain of Fire and Miracles Ministries =

Nigerian religious denomination

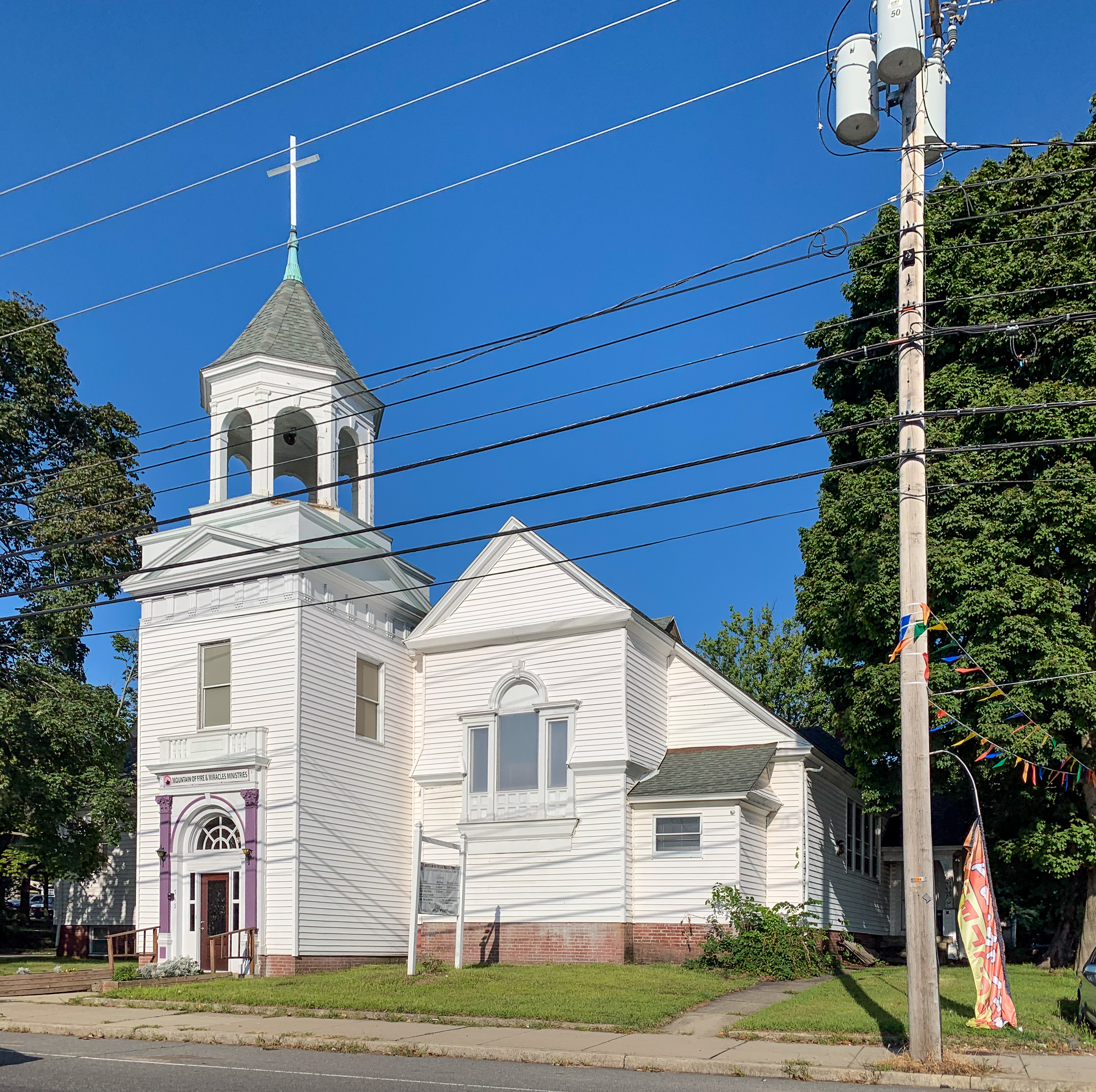
Mountain of Fire and Miracles Ministries church in East Providence, Rhode Island

The Mountain of Fire and Miracles Ministries (MFM) is a Pentecostal denomination founded in Yaba, Lagos, Lagos State, Nigeria in 1989, now with churches in several countries. It was founded by Dr. Daniel Kolawole Olukoya ("DKO"). Many publications on deliverance have been credited to Olukoya, such as the popular prayer books known as Prayer Rain, Prayer Passport to Crush Oppression, and Pray Your Way to Breakthroughs.

Unlike a few popular charismatic and Pentecostal African initiated ministries promoting prosperity gospel, MFM's leadership and its sub-ministry, Battle Cry Ministries, place emphasis on deliverance ministry and prayers against the works of demonic forces. It instructs and teaches members how to deal with their foundation (issues stemming from one's parents and ancestry), ancestral spirits, and hidden evil and spiritual forces hindering progress toward the fulfilment of their "destiny", resulting in a theology that promotes practices dominated by prayer points to free individuals from hidden bondages. The Mountain of Fire is also known for its optimum dedication to music (e.g. orchestras, guitar choir) and sports. The General Overseer of Mountain of Fire & Miracles Ministries, Dr. Daniel Olukoya, made the call at the opening ceremony of the Mountain Top Conservatory of Music [MTCM] and the launching of Mountain Top Conservatory Choir and Philharmonic Orchestra (MCCPO) at MFM headquarters, Onike, Lagos.

- Mountain of Fire and Miracles Ministries was founded by Daniel Kolawole Olukoya at a prayer meeting in 1989 in his living room.
- The prayer group purchased a large site at an abandoned slum near the University of Lagos and converted it into the International Headquarters of the Mountain of Fire and Miracles Ministries, of which Olukoya is the General Overseer. The first service there was held on 24 April 1994.
- At the new location, worshippers and those seeking help kept coming, leading to a very large congregation. This situation posed a challenge of crowd, growth and expansion management to the leadership of the church. Thus, MFM created a network of branches in every state capital, local government headquarters, senatorial district and locality.
- According to the group's literature, it is committed to "the Revival of Apostolic Signs, Holy Ghost fireworks and the unlimited demonstration of the power of God to deliver to the uttermost". As the name would imply, the Mountain of Fire and Miracles Ministries places a great emphasis on wonders, miracles and other Apostolic acts.

From humble beginnings in the home of Olukoya, MFM has grown to over 300 churches within Nigeria and branches in African and Western countries. Those branches located outside the African continent mainly cater to African immigrant population.

== Distinctive practices ==
Visible among book sellers on the street of the church's headquarters is MFM's leadership litany of publications on prayer points against demonic and hidden forces opposed to personal fulfillment and growth.

MFM describes itself as "a do-it-yourself gospel ministry, where your hands are trained to wage war and your fingers to do battle" (see also Psalm 144:1, 18:34). This militant tone against spiritual wickedness is reflected throughout the teachings of MFM, where it calls upon members to become spiritually aggressive Christians, and some of the groups founded by MFM call themselves names such as the Prayer Warriors, Men of Valor, the Territorial Intercessors and God's Violent Army. This does not mean physical violence by MFM theology, as the battles take place in spiritual realms only.

As with many Plain dress churches, all women are required to wear skirts and headcovers when attending MFM services in any location. Prayers tend to be repetitions of faith-based claims, spiritual decrees and commanding prayers often directly from Scriptures and proclaim that safety lies within Jesus Christ. Although prayers are loud and believed to be "spiritually violent", it is noteworthy that the church preaches against physical violence, typically alluding to Paul's teachings on Christian warfare (2 Cor 10:4, Eph 6:12).

Olukoya teaches that "The Bible refers to homosexuals and lesbians as dogs". Its "deliverance" events have been viewed as code for "pray the gay away". An undercover reporter in Liverpool was urged by an assistant pastor to cure himself of homosexuality by fasting for 3 days; however, MFM said that this was not sanctioned by the movement, and denied that it promoted conversion therapy.

In 2019, Pastor Daniel said at the church Headquarters in Lagos State that it is "unbiblical" to celebrate Christmas as there is no such word in the Bible and neither did the Bible state that Christ was born on December 25. He said "If you really study the Bible from Genesis to Revelation, there is no word like Christmas. The Bible only recorded that the Shepherds were taking care of their flocks during a very cold season when they sighted the star that announced the birth of Jesus Christ. This cold period could be around April or May".

== Leadership ==
MFM is headed by a General Overseer, who is also the main theologian of the church. He is assisted by Assistant General Overseers, helming specific departments.

== Properties ==
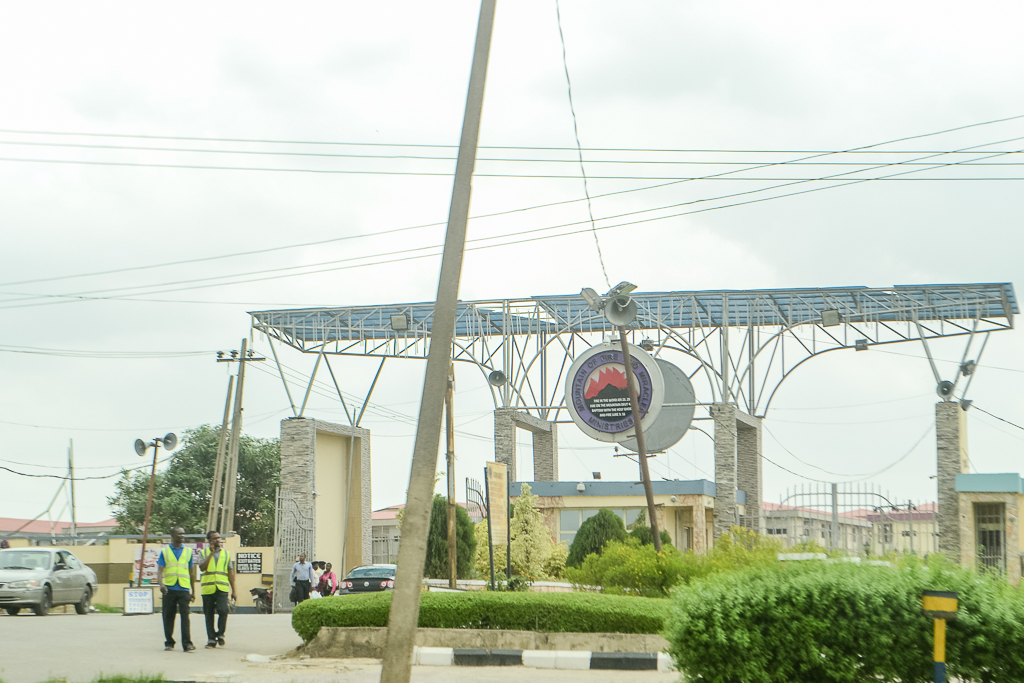
Mountain of Fire and Miracles Ministries Main Entrance

MFM owns a large expanse of land along Lagos–Ibadan Expressway called Prayer City, located close to the international camp of the Redeemed Christian Church of God. Among structures located within the camp is an auditorium capable of holding 100,000 members during special occasions.

In Enugu, MFM's worship centre was judged to have been constructed illegally, and despite its popularity it was demolished in 2013 by the state government.

== Lawsuit in United States ==
In 2017, the church had some legal battles with former pastors who separated from MFM and claimed a church building in the United States. The former pastors alleged that Olukoya engaged in fraud including evasion of US import duties. Ultimately, the property dispute was ultimately settled in favour of MFM by a United States court.

== Investigation in United Kingdom ==
The UK Charity Commission (which regulates registered charities in the UK) opened an official investigation into the church in 2018, citing concerns about administrative and financial weaknesses, including failure to submit the required accounts. In August 2019, the Commission appointed an interim manager for the MFM charity.

== See also ==
- Daniel Kolawole Olukoya
- Joseph Ayo Babalola
- Enoch Adeboye
- Redeemed Christian Church of God
- MFM FC
- Mountain Top University
