= Jonesborough United Methodist Church =

Historic church in Tennessee, United States

- U.S. Historic district – Contributing property
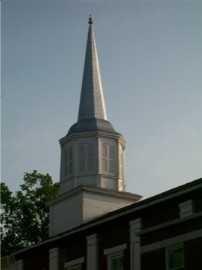
- Jonesborough United Methodist Church

- Location within Tennessee Location within the United States
- Location: Jonesborough, Tennessee
- Coordinates: 36.2932°N 82.4756°W
- Part of: Jonesborough Historic District (ID69000183)
- Designated CP: December 23, 1969

Jonesborough United Methodist Church is a church in Jonesborough, Tennessee. Its building is listed on the National Register of Historic Places as a contributing property in the Jonesborough Historic District.

== History ==
The church was formed in 1822 under the leadership of a layman from Nashville, H. R. W. Hill. The church's first building was located behind the town courthouse, on the public square. Later, due to the planned coming of the railroad, land was purchased at the present location, in 1847, for the construction of the current building, which was opened late that year.

Notable members of the congregation in the early years were Elbert F. Sevier, a grandson of Governor John Sevier; Parson William Gannaway Brownlow (later governor of Tennessee during Reconstruction); and Elijah Embree Hoss (who became a bishop of the Methodist Episcopal Church, South). The building was tied up in a legal battle immediately following the Civil War, as members loyal to either side of that political battle tried to gain control of the property. The property issue was settled in 1869, as recorded in the Washington County Court records. Major renovations were made in 1945 and 1959. The exterior of the church building is much like it was originally.

== Architecture ==
The church was built in a Greek Revival style. A balcony along the back wall was at one time set aside for people of color.
