= Robert Matthews (religious figure) =

American religious figure (1788–c. 1841)

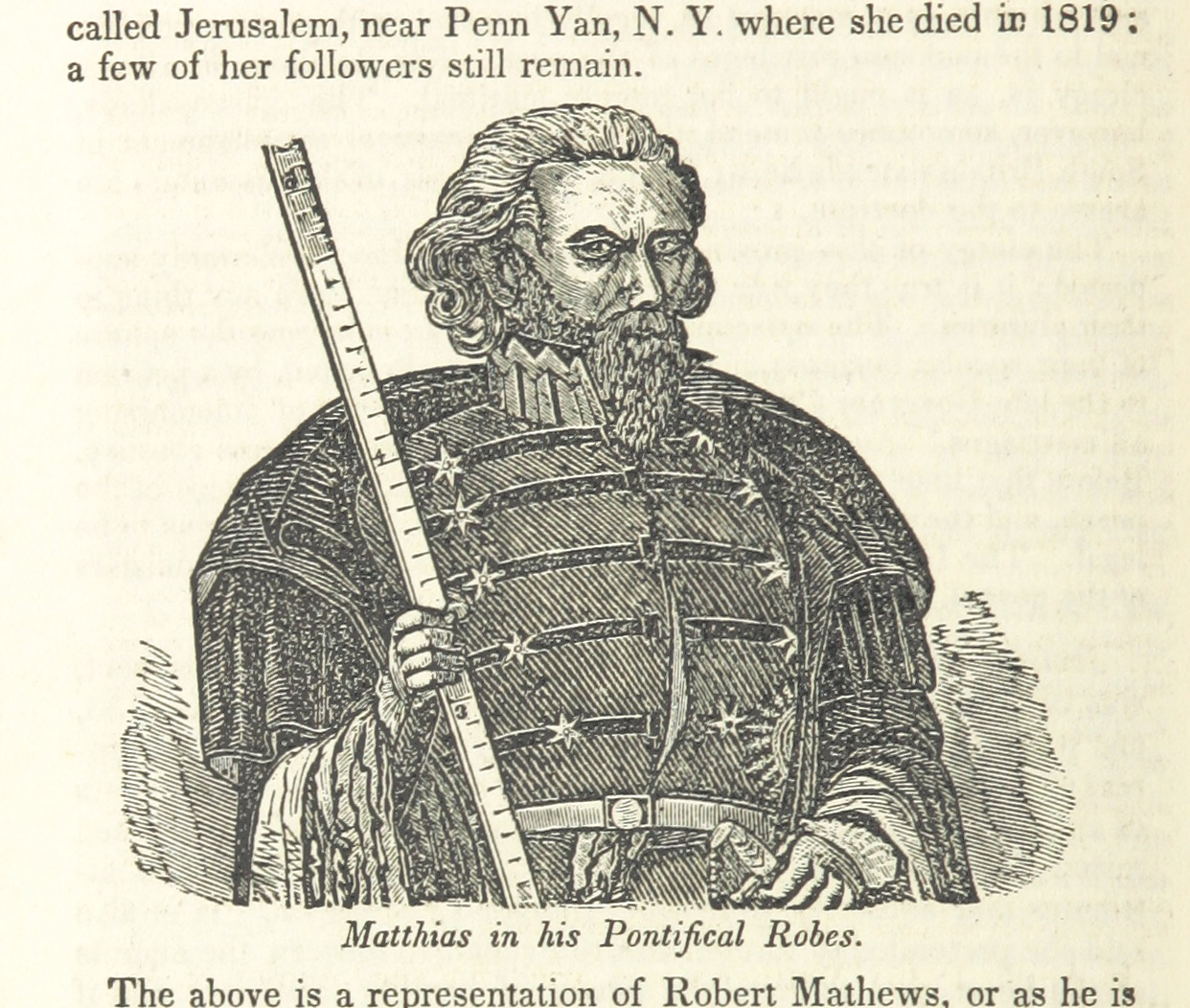
- Robert Matthias in his pontifical robes
- Born: 1788; Cambridge, New York, U.S.
- Died: c. 1841 (aged approx. 53); Iowa Territory, U.S.
- Other names: Robert Matthias; Jesus Matthias; Matthias the Prophet; Joshua the Jewish Minister
- Occupations: Carpenter; Businessman; Religious leader
- Known for: Founding of "The Kingdom" at Mount Zion, Sing Sing, New York

Robert Matthews (1788–c. 1841) was an American carpenter, businessman, and religious figure who gathered a cult-like following in 1830s New York. His aliases included Robert Matthias, Jesus Matthias, Matthias the Prophet, The Prophet Matthias, and Joshua the Jewish Minister. Newspapers on the other-hand often called him by names such as "Matthews the Imposter." Matthews successfully converted three wealthy businessmen who helped fund the founding of a settlement he called The Kingdom, in Sing Sing village, New York. The Kingdom, also known as Mount Zion, eventually became involved in adultery, bankruptcy, and the suspected murder of Elijah Pierson; consequently landing Matthews in jail. He is also remembered for his brief encounter with Joseph Smith, the founder of the Latter Day Saint movement.

== Early life and career ==
Matthews was born in 1788 in the farming village of Cambridge, in Washington County, New York, and was raised an Anti-Burgher Presbyterian. In 1795 both of his parents died, leaving him along with his four brothers and five sisters to the care of kin and neighbors.

In 1806, Robert began learning carpentry and by 1808 had moved to Manhattan. After accusations of assault and battery on a female (possibly his sister-in-law), Robert returned to Cambridge and set up a successful business. During this time Matthews made occasional visits to New York City and met Margaret, who he married in 1813. Robert's business went bankrupt shortly thereafter in 1816. He went with his family back to Manhattan, where he recouped his losses, but two of his children died and a few years later he went bankrupt again.

== Religious career ==
Around this time, Matthews began making strange religious professions and having erratic and sometimes violent mood swings. He left his strict Calvinist teachings and briefly became interested in Methodism, followed by Judaism. He began saying he was no longer a Christian but a "prophesying Hebrew" like his hero, the writer Mordecai Manuel Noah. Noah had planned to build a home for the Jewish people in upstate New York, and Matthews believed it was his mission to help Noah; his wife meanwhile believed he was going insane. He moved a number of times to be closer to Noah's planned community, but when it never came to fruition, in 1825 he relocated to Albany with his family following a few months later. Matthews began to come out of his downward spiral in Albany, where he attended the North Dutch Church, but another one of his children died and he began to beat his wife again. He tried to join a church, but his application was rejected. Matthews stopped shaving and claimed to receive several visions of great events that would shortly come to pass.

In June 1830, he had a prophetic vision in a dream of a flood descending on Albany. He fled the city fearing its destruction, abandoning his wife after she refused to flee with him. Matthews took three of his sons in his escape, but his wife and her church friends helped organize a search, and they were found the following Sunday in Argyle. The children were unhurt, and Matthews, who was deemed insane, was confined to the Albany almshouse for two weeks. After he returned home, his wife tried to divorce him but it was impossible under New York law at the time since there had been no adultery, she then tried to have him arrested for assault but was unable to prove it. Matthews continued to develop his new theology, now blaming what he saw as hypocritical Christians in the church for his problems, and in 1831 Matthews headed west to investigate the revivals there, where he decided to take the name Matthias after the disciple chosen to replace Judas and the reformer Jan Matthias. He first declared himself as "The Prophet Matthias" in Rochester, New York, but not finding success, left two weeks later, slowly working his way back to Albany where his wife told him to leave again if he didn't plan to work. Matthews then went west again, then south-east to Washington D.C., and finally up to New York City where he preached on the street for a while but was unable to interest anyone until he visited Elijah Pierson, a well known religious figure in Manhattan.

Pierson was convinced by Matthews and turned his pulpit over to him the following Sunday, with a congregation of about 50 or 60 people. Another merchant named Sylvester Mills was also devoted to Matthews; Mills and Pierson helped him dress the part and supplied him with luxuries. At one point Christian friends of Mills brought the police who arrested Matthews, cut off his beard, and put him in an asylum for the insane; Matthews was soon released but Mills remained in the asylum.

=== Mount Zion ===
Pierson's old friends Benjamin and Ann Folger who lived in Sing Sing, New York came to visit him when they heard of what was going on. Over the next year Pierson and Matthews gradually convinced them that Matthews was legitimate, and that Christianity was evil and they should leave their old church, avoid prayer meetings, and join Matthews. Matthews moved into the Folger's home in Sing Sing, which he named Mount Zion, followed by Pierson and his former servant Isabella Van Wagenen, now employed by Matthews. Matthews ruled as the absolute patriarch over the estate, where he designated chores and tasks for the residents of his kingdom to complete.

While at Mount Zion, Matthews controversially had an affair with, and then married, Anne Folger, saying the two were "match spirits" and that she would have a child who would be the Messiah.

Reluctant to accept the situation, Anne's former husband Benjamin Folger went to Albany on orders of Matthews to retrieve Matthews' children. On the return trip from Albany, Folger engaged in sexual relations with Matthews' oldest daughter Isabella Laisdell, who was married to Charles Laisdell. Upon discovering that Isabella and Benjamin were engaged in an affair, Matthews whipped her severely, but then joined them in marriage, approving the union. Isabella remained at Mount Zion for several weeks until her husband tracked her down and demanded she return to Albany. Folger was then married to another resident of The Kingdom, but tiring of Matthews, Folger ordered him out of the house and demanded his wife Anne back, a request which was refused.

Around this time, Elijah suffered from several health problems and suddenly died under mysterious circumstances. Folger, determined to end Matthews' Kingdom, had Matthews arrested and briefly incarcerated for obtaining money under false pretenses.

In 1835, Matthews and his housekeeper Isabella (later known as Sojourner Truth) were accused of murdering Pierson. However, they were acquitted due to lack of evidence, and Truth's presentation of several letters verifying her trustworthiness as a servant. The trial then focused on the reported beating of his daughter which he was found guilty of. The trial which lasted four days, resulted in a sentencing of three months and 30 additional days for contempt of court.

== Later life and death ==
Upon his release from prison later in 1835, Matthews traveled through Kirtland, Ohio. On 9 November of that year, he paid a visit to Joseph Smith under the pseudonym "Joshua the Jewish Minister." The two discussed resurrection and reincarnation. Matthews claimed to be both God and the reincarnation of the apostle Matthias; he also said he was a literal descendant of Matthias, and that transmigration of the soul typically went from father to son. False rumors circulated that Matthews had joined the Mormons, but in fact his meeting with Smith ended with the two prophets denouncing each other as Satanic.

At one point, Matthews was committed to a hospital for the insane in New York. He is reported to have died in Iowa Territory in 1841.

== See also ==
- God complex
- Religious delusion
