= Elijah Mitchell (footballer) =

Bahamian footballer (born 2003)

Personal information
- Full name: Elijah Christian Christophe Mitchell
- Date of birth: 23 February 2003 (age 23)
- Place of birth: Nassau, Bahamas
- Height: 1.65 m (5 ft 5 in)
- Positions: Winger; attacking midfielder

Youth career
- 2017–2019: Renegades
- 2019–2021: Darlington Soccer Academy

College career
Years	Team	Apps	(Gls)
2021	BSC Panthers	14	(1)

Senior career*
Years	Team	Apps	(Gls)
2022	Renegades	0	(0)

International career
	Bahamas U15	7	(0)
	Bahamas U17	5	(0)
2021–2023	Bahamas	8	(0)
- * Club domestic league appearances and goals

Elijah Mitchell (born 23 February 2003) is a Bahamian former footballer who played as a winger or attacking midfielder.

== Career ==
Mitchell played for Renegades FC until August 2019, when he moved to Rome, Georgia to join Darlington School Soccer Academy. He enrolled at the Birmingham–Southern College in 2021, going on to make fourteen appearances for the school's Panthers soccer team, scoring once in a 4–0 win against the Hawks of Huntingdon College.

== International career ==
Mitchell represented the Bahamas at under-15 and under-17 level.

== Personal life ==
Mitchell is the younger cousin of Fred Mitchell, the current Minister of Foreign Affairs and Public Service for the Bahamas. He is also the younger cousin of former Bahamas national football team players Demont Mitchell and Denair Mitchell.

== Career statistics ==
=== International ===
As of match played 3 May 2023.

National team	Year	Apps	Goals
Bahamas	2021	2	0
Bahamas	2022	2	0
Bahamas	2023	4	0
Total		8	0
