= Mountain Top University =

Private university in Nigeria

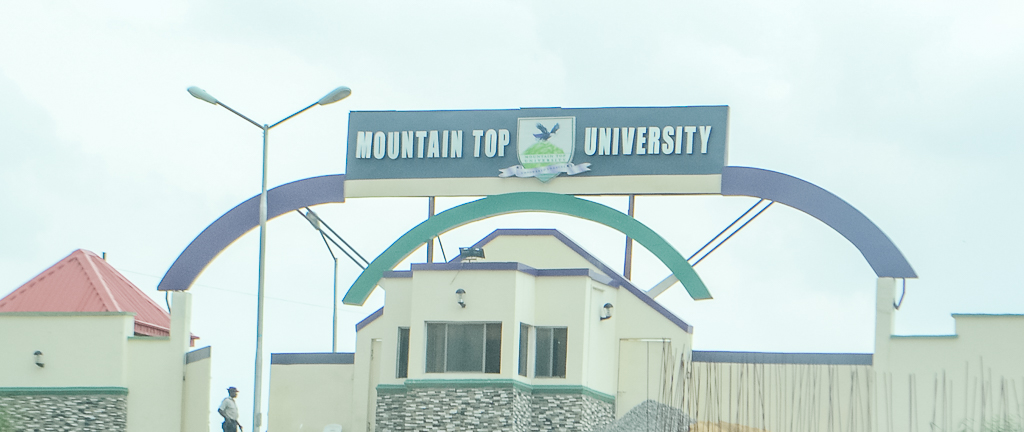
- Motto: Empowered To Excel
- Type: Private
- Established: 2015
- Chancellor: Prof Daniel Kolawole Olukoya
- Vice-Chancellor: Prof. Elijah Ayolabi
- Students: 1800(Undergraduate)
- Location: Km 12 Lagos/Ibadan Expressway, Ogun State, Nigeria
- Website: mtu.edu.ng

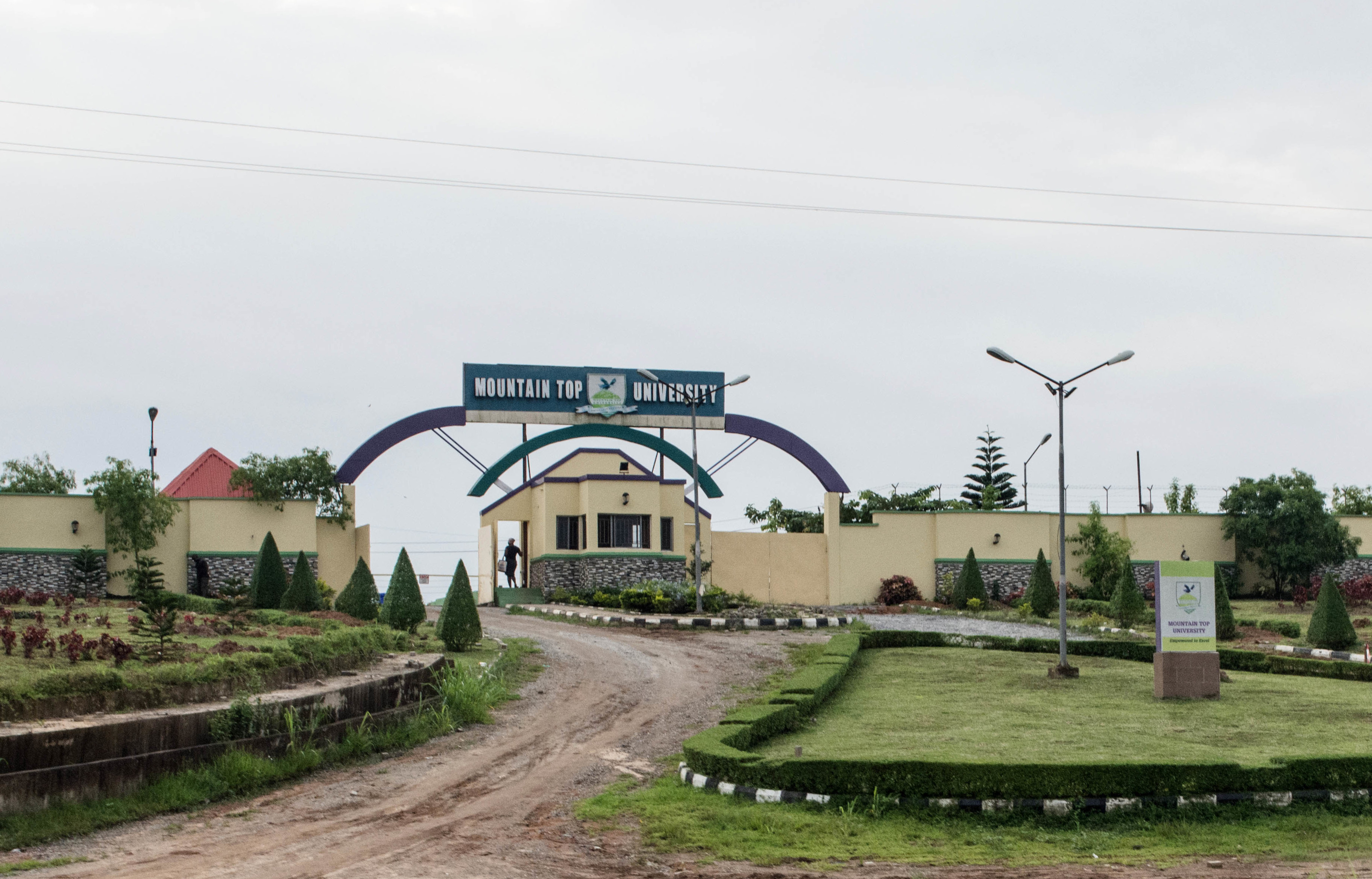
Mountain Top University Main Entrance

Mountain Top University is a private university in Makogi Oba, Ogun State, Nigeria, founded in 2015. Known for its strictness and enforcement of spiritual activities as well as having one of the best music departments in the country.

MTU was founded by Mountain of Fire and Miracles Ministries, a Pentecostal Christian denomination. The ministry itself was founded by Daniel Kolawole Olukoya.
