= Daniel Kolawole Olukoya =

Nigerian pastor (born 1957)

Daniel K. Olukoya
- Born: Daniel Kolawole Olukoya; July 15, 1957 (age 69)
- Other name: Olukoya
- Occupations: Pastor; Scientist; Professor
- Spouse: Shade Olukoya (m. 1989)
- Children: 1 (Elijah Toluwani Olukoya)

Ecclesiastical career
- Church: M.F.M

Daniel Kolawole Olukoya better noted as Dr D.K Olukoya (born 15 July 1957) is a Nigerian pastor, scientist and professor. He is the founder and General Overseer of Mountain of Fire and Miracles Ministries. Olukoya is the first Nigerian scientist to clone genes.

== Early life and education ==
Daniel Olukoya was born in Akure, Ondo State, Nigeria to Mr. Olukoya, a police officer and Mrs. Olukoya, a trader. He attended St. John's CAC Primary School, in Akure.

Later when his family relocated to Lagos, he was enrolled at St. Jude's Primary school, Ebute Metta, from which he graduated.

Olukoya then proceeded to Methodist Boys' High School (MBHS), Broad Street, Lagos.

In 1976, Olukoya was awarded a scholarship into the University of Lagos (UNILAG) to study microbiology. He graduated from UNILAG with a first-class degree in microbiology. He was the first person to have achieved a first-class in the course at the university and his G.P.A is still the highest recorded so far (as of February 2010) in that department.

Soon after graduation, he won a scholarship to have his PhD programme degree in molecular genetics at the University of Reading, United Kingdom. Olukoya earned his PhD in 3 years and then came back to Nigeria.

== Scientific career ==
Upon his return to Nigeria, Olukoya joined the Nigerian Institute of Medical Research (NIMR), Yaba. Olukoya published over 70 scientific papers in a short span.

He also taught genetics and was external examiner in a number of universities. He has attended and presented papers at scientific conferences in almost all countries of the world. Olukoya continues to contribute to the field of genetics and biotechnology via the Daniel & Fola Biotechnology Foundation in Nigeria, a registered NGO established to empower Nigerian citizens with modern and contemporary laboratory skills in molecular biology and biotechnology.

As a researcher at the Nigerian Institute of Medical Research, Lagos, Olukoya made significant contributions to biotechnology and health. One of these was the invention of a new type of Ogi named DogiK that can control diarrhea and also contains some improved nutritional qualities.

In April 2019 the University of Lagos awarded Olukoya with a Doctor of Science.

Olukoya become a professor of biotechnology at Mountain Top University in December 2022.

== Ministry ==
Olukoya is the founder of Mountain of Fire and Miracles Ministry. The church began in a rented hall on Old Yaba road, Ebute Meta, Lagos, in the early 1990s, but now has branches across Nigeria and abroad. The church owns a tertiary institution, the Mountain Top University, and a football club, MFM FC.

Olukoya's ministry, Mountain of Fire and Miracles Ministries, is one of the most popular and widespread African Christian ministries, with branches in over 120 countries.

Olukoya's father, apart from being a policeman, was also a pastor at the Christ Apostolic Church. Olukoya's ministry is influenced by the work of Joseph Ayo Babalola, the founder of the Christ Apostolic Church.

Olukoya has conducted missions in many countries.

Olukoya has a mentorship program organized by him to mentor pastors.

== Personal life ==
Olukoya is married to Elizabeth Folasade Olukoya. They got married in 1989, and have a son.

== Works ==
Olukoya has written over 250 books, covering gospel, spirituality, deliverance and other subjects. He has published works to include over 400 Christian books, audio tapes and CDs, video discs and others.

Books written by Olukoya include:

- Prayer Rain
- Stop Them Before They Stop You
- Overpowering Witchcraft
- Brokenness
- Deliverance from Spirit Husband and Spirit Wife
- Dealing with Hidden Curses
- Deep Secret of the Enemies
- Deliverance from the Rod of the Wicked
- The Jehu's Prayers
- Beat The Best and Be The Best

== Music ==
Olukoya is also a musician and song composer. His song, "Oke Nla Sidi", meaning "O ye mountain, be removed" was said to be formed after many years of waiting on the Lord for his son. A new version and edition of this song was sung and produced by the Lagos State University Department of Music and Arts to honour Olukoya.

Olukoya writes for church choirs and he also likes to write in solo voices. Highlighted below are some of his songs:

- Nipa Eso Won
- Ina Olorun Beteli
- Ma sai bikita
- Ekun mi yio dayo
- Mo fe gbo ohun re
- Gbekele Jesu
- Mo gbojule Jesu
- Jeka dupe
- Awon to duro de Oluwa

== Awards and Legacy ==
In 2012, Olukoya was conferred with his first honorary doctorate degree from the Joseph Ayo Babalola University Osun state, for his contributions to music and religion.

In 2019, he was conferred with an honorary doctorate degree from the University of Lagos State for his contributions to the university and his inputs in music education.

Olukoya has also been awarded by several music institutions, Nigerian musical society (NMS), Musical society of Nigeria (MSN), music departments of different universities in Nigeria for his incessant and interminable support and contributions towards music all over Nigeria.

In December 1, Olukoya was awarded with an honour of a degree in Management Science by Federal University of Technology Akure for his contribution to Science, Education and Spirituality in Nigeria.
