= Sean Wilentz =

American historian (born 1951)

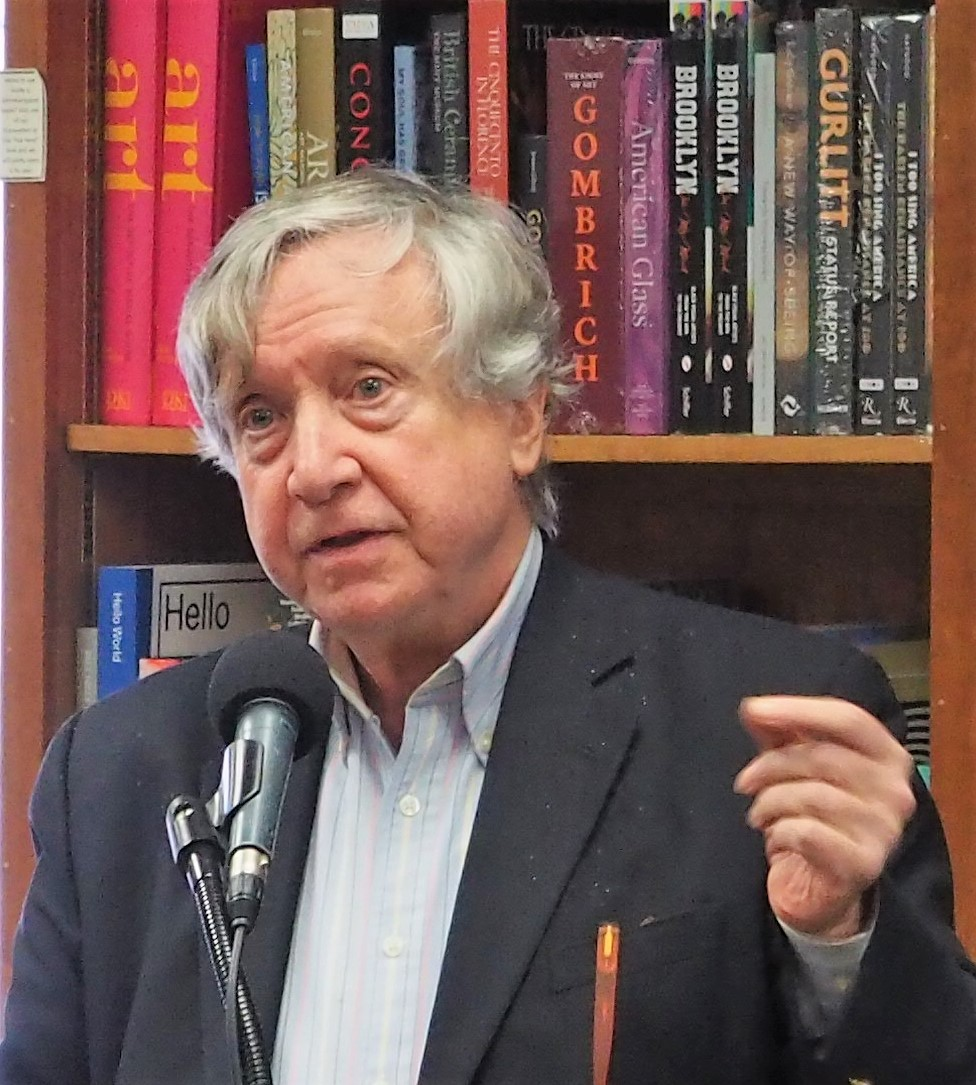
- Wilentz in 2019
- Born: Robert Sean Wilentz; February 20, 1951 (age 75); New York City, New York, U.S.
- Education: Columbia University (BA); Balliol College, Oxford (BA); Yale University (MA, PhD)
- Occupations: Historian; academic; professor; writer
- Awards: Bancroft Prize (2006); Pulitzer Prize finalist (2006); Albert J. Beveridge Award (1984)

Robert Sean Wilentz (/wɪˈlɛnts/; born February 20, 1951) is an American historian who serves as the George Henry Davis 1886 Professor of American History at Princeton University, where he has taught since 1979. His primary research interests include U.S. social, civic, and political history in the nineteenth and twentieth centuries. He has written several award-winning books and articles, including The Rise of American Democracy: Jefferson to Lincoln, which was awarded the Bancroft Prize and was a finalist for the Pulitzer Prize for History.

== Early life and education ==
Wilentz was born on February 20, 1951, in New York City. His father, Eli Wilentz, and his uncle Theodore "Ted" Wilentz, owned the Eighth Street Bookshop, a well-known Greenwich Village bookstore. He is of Irish and Jewish ancestry.

Wilentz attended Midwood High School in Brooklyn, and earned a B.A. from Columbia University in 1972 and a second B.A. from Balliol College, Oxford in 1974 on a Kellett Fellowship. One of his mentors at Columbia University was U.S. history scholar James P. Shenton. In 1975 he earned an M.A. from Yale University. In 1980, he received his Ph.D. from Yale under the supervision of David Brion Davis.

== Career ==
=== Scholarship ===
Wilentz's historical scholarship has focused on the importance of class and race during the early national period of the USA, especially in New York City. Wilentz has also co-authored books on nineteenth century religion and working class life in the USA. The Rise of American Democracy: Jefferson to Lincoln (W. W. Norton, 2005) won the Bancroft Prize. In May 2008, he authored The Age of Reagan: A History, 1974–2008.

Columbia University professor Eric Foner, a long-time friend, says Wilentz "has written some of the very best examples of the avant-garde of the 70s and the avant-garde more recently. Back then we were trying to recover a lost past or neglected past. More recently historians have been trying to integrate that vision into a larger vision of American history as a whole."

While a professor at Princeton, Wilentz was the senior thesis advisor to Elena Kagan, a U.S. Supreme Court associate justice.

In 2002, Wilentz criticized then-Supreme Court Justice Antonin Scalia for a speech in which Scalia cited Christian perspectives on the afterlife and the role of government in support of the death penalty. Wilentz accused Scalia of “wishing to abandon the intent of the Constitution’s framers and impose views of government and divinity that no Supreme Court Justice, no matter how conservative, has ever embraced.”

In 2019, Wilentz, along with fellow historians James Oakes, James M. McPherson, Victoria E. Bynum, and Gordon S. Wood, sent a letter to The New York Times, critiquing aspects of the Times’s 1619 Project. Specifically, Wilentz and the other letter writers argued that the Project made inaccurate claims about a desire to protect slavery on the part of the Patriots as a driving force behind the American Revolution. Wilentz later criticized the Trump Administration’s 1776 Commission as the “mirror image” of the 1619 Project and argued that it “reduced history to hero worship.”

=== Music ===
As a contributing editor at The New Republic, Wilentz has published essays about music, the arts, history, and politics. He received a Grammy Award nomination and a 2005 ASCAP Deems Taylor Award for the liner notes Wilentz contributed to the album The Bootleg Series Vol. 6: Bob Dylan Live 1964, Concert at Philharmonic Hall.

In 2010, Wilentz published Bob Dylan In America, which placed Dylan in the context of American twentieth century history and culture. The book includes essays on Dylan's relationship with Aaron Copland, Allen Ginsberg, and the Beat Generation, and the recording of Blonde on Blonde.

== Politics ==
Wilentz has prominently engaged in current political debate. He is a long-time family friend of Bill and Hillary Clinton, and has been a staunch public defender of the Clintons. On December 8, 1998, he appeared before the House Judiciary Committee to argue against the Clinton impeachment. He told House members that, if they voted for impeachment, but were not convinced Clinton's offenses were impeachable, "...history will track you down and condemn you for your cravenness". His testimony cheered Democratic partisans, but was criticized by The New York Times, which lamented his "gratuitously patronizing presentation" in an editorial.

In 2006, he wrote an article in Rolling Stone denouncing the George W. Bush presidency as "The Worst President in History?" In response, National Review attacked Wilentz's analysis as "blinkered", calling him "the modern Arthur Schlesinger Jr".

Wilentz followed up during the 2008 election with another article in Rolling Stone, describing how the failures of the Bush administration had caused a "political meltdown" of the Republican Party, with potentially enormous long-term effects. In the wake of the October, 2013 federal government shutdown, he authored another article in Rolling Stone on what he called a "crisis" within the Republican Party, claiming the party was gradually descending into extremism.

In 2008, Wilentz was an outspoken supporter of then U.S. Senator Hillary Clinton, the Democratic nominee for president. He wrote an essay in The New Republic analyzing U.S. Senator Barack Obama's campaign, charging Obama with creating "manipulative illusion[s]" and "distortions," and having "purposefully polluted the [primary electoral] contest" with "the most outrageous deployment of racial politics since the Willie Horton ad campaign in 1988". During the 2008 Democratic National Convention, Wilentz charged in Newsweek that "liberal intellectuals have largely abdicated their responsibility to provide unblinking and rigorous analysis" of Obama. "Hardly any prominent liberal thinkers" have questioned his "rationalizations" about his relationship to his former pastor, Rev. Jeremiah Wright Jr., or "his patently evasive accounts" of his "ties" to the "unrepentant terrorist William Ayers". For Wilentz, Obama was untested, cloudy, and problematic, with liberal intellectuals giving him a free ride. Wilentz was criticized by bloggers and others for his criticism of Obama.

In January 2014, Wilentz took issue with those involved in the 2013 NSA leaks, including those related to Edward Snowden, Glenn Greenwald, and Julian Assange. In Wilentz's view, "the value of some of their revelations does not mean that they deserve the prestige and influence that has been accorded to them. The leakers and their supporters would never hand the state modern surveillance powers, even if they came wrapped in all sorts of rules and regulations that would constrain their abuse. They are right to worry, but wrong – even paranoid – to distrust democratic governments in this way. Surveillance and secrecy will never be attractive features of a democratic government, but they are not inimical to it, either. This the leakers will never understand."

Wilentz was a signatory of "A Letter on Justice and Open Debate", published in Harper's Magazine in July 2020, which argued that segments of the American left were demonstrating “an intolerance for opposing views, a vogue for public shaming and ostracism, and the tendency to dissolve complex policy issues in a binding moral certainty,” while also calling then-President Donald Trump “a real threat to democracy.”

=== Donald Trump ===
In October 2020, Wilentz called U.S. President Donald Trump "the worst president in American history" for his handling of the COVID-19 pandemic and political polarization of the country. He further wrote that Trump and Attorney General William Barr had created the greatest "existential crisis for American democracy" since the American Civil War through their politicization of the U.S. Department of Justice and attempted delegitimization of the 2020 presidential election, comparing Trump's ideology to the Confederacy and calling it "a bacillus of racism and authoritarianism". He also claimed Barr was advancing "an Americanized version of something more akin to Generalissimo Francisco Franco's Spain" and "a theocracy, overseen by a president who more closely resembles an elected monarch".

After the 2021 attack on the United States Capitol, Wilentz predicted that if Trump and the Republican Party returned to power in the 2022 and 2024 elections, they would legally establish "a more or less ironclad system of undemocratic minority rule" to permanently block liberal policies and end majority democracy, calling them "right-wing Bolsheviks". He compared Trump to John C. Calhoun and Richard Nixon.

During an interview by historian Julian Zelizer on the May 9, 2025 edition of The Long View, Wilentz discussed whether President Andrew Jackson ever defied the Supreme Court, as claimed by supporters of Donald Trump in order to justify actions by Trump and his administration since his second inauguration in 2025. Wilentz corrected a misquote frequently attributed to Jackson regarding the Supreme Court, provided the documented history of related aspects of the Jackson presidency, and discussed how strongly Jackson supported the rule of law. He also enumerated the articles of the Constitution that are being violated by Trump and his administration.

== Personal life ==
Wilentz lives in Princeton, New Jersey, with his wife Caroline Cleaves and their children. He has two children from his first marriage, to the historian Christine Stansell.

Wilentz is a Princeton Athletics Fellow for the Princeton Tigers baseball team.

== Awards ==
- 1984 Beveridge Award from the American Historical Association for Chants Democratic: New York City and the Rise of the American Working Class, 1788–1850
- 2006 Bancroft Prize for The Rise of American Democracy: Jefferson to Lincoln

== Bibliography ==
=== Books ===
- Chants Democratic: New York City & the Rise of the American Working Class, 1788–1850, 1984.
- Merrill, Michael, and Sean Wilentz, eds. The Key of Liberty: The Life and Democratic Writings of William Manning, "A Laborer," 1747–1814, 1993.
- The Kingdom of Matthias, 1994 (co-authored with Paul E. Johnson).
- Andrew Jackson, 2005.
- The Rise of American Democracy: Jefferson to Lincoln, 2005.
- Rose and the Briar: Death, Love and Liberty in the American Ballad, Wilentz, Sean and Greil Marcus, eds., 2005.
- Major Problems in the Early Republic, Wilentz, Sean, and Jonathan Earle, eds., 1992; 2nd ed. 2007.
- The Age of Reagan: A History, 1974–2008, 2008.
- "Abraham Lincoln and Jacksonian Democracy", in Foner, Eric, ed. Our Lincoln: New Perspectives on Lincoln and His World, 2008.
- The Best American History Essays on Lincoln, Wilentz, Sean, ed., 2009.
- Bob Dylan in America, New York: Doubleday, 2010. ISBN 978-0-385-52988-4
- "President Ulysses S. Grant and the Battle for Equality", in Isaacson, Walter, ed., Profiles in Leadership: Historians on the Elusive Quality of Greatness, W. W. Norton & Company, 2010.
- "Democracy at Gettysburg", in Conant, Sean, ed. The Gettysburg Address: Perspectives on Lincoln's Greatest Speech, Oxford University Press, 2015.
- The Politicians and the Egalitarians: The Hidden History of American Politics, W. W. Norton & Company, 2016. ISBN 978-0-393-28502-4
- No Property in Man: Slavery and Antislavery at the Nation’s Founding, Harvard University Press, 2018. ISBN 978-0-674-97222-3
- "Introduction" by Sean Wilentz to Fred W. McDarrah: New York Scenes, Abrams Books, 2018.
- Bob Dylan: Through the Open Window, 1956–1963 Publisher : Abrams Books October 13, 2026

=== Academic papers ===
- On Class and Politics in Jacksonian America, Reviews in American History, Vol. 10, No. 4, The Promise of American History: Progress and Prospects (Dec., 1982), pp. 45–63
- "Against Exceptionalism: Class Consciousness and the American Labor Movement, 1790–1920," International Labor and Working Class History, 26 (Fall 1984): 1–24,

=== Articles ===
- "The Sedition of Donald Trump", Rolling Stone Magazine, October 11, 2020,
- Wilentz, Sean (August 15, 2024). "The 'Dred Scott' of Our Time". New York Review of Books. LXXI (13): 33–35.

=== Book reviews ===
Year	Review article	Work(s) reviewed
2019	Wilentz, Sean (March 7, 2019). "Presumed Guilty". The New York Review of Books. 66 (4): 40–42.	Starr, Ken. Contempt: A Memoir of the Clinton investigation. Sentinel.

=== Critical studies and reviews ===
The Age of Reagan: a history, 1974–2008

- John Ehrman ""There He Goes Again: A review of The Age of Reagan: A History, 1974-2008, Sean Wilentz", The Claremont Institute (2008), review by conservative scholar

The rise of American democracy : Jackson to Lincoln

- Altschuler, Glenn C., "Democracy as a Work in Progress", Reviews in American History, Volume 34, Number 2, June 2006, pp. 169–175 in Project Muse, review of The Rise of American Democracy: Jefferson to Lincoln
