= Elihu =

Elihu is a masculine given name. Bearers of the name include:

== People ==
- Elihu Abrahams (1927–2018), American theoretical physicist
- Elihu Anthony (1818–1905), American alcalde, blacksmith, industrialist, abolitionist
- Elihu Burritt (1811–1879), American philanthropist, linguist, and social activist
- Elihu Doty (1809–1864), American missionary to China
- Elihu Embree (1782–1820), American abolitionist and publisher of the first newspaper in the United States devoted exclusively to that cause
- Elihu Goodsell (1806–1880), American politician
- Elihu Harris (born 1947), mayor of Oakland, California, United States
- Elihu B. Hayes (1848–1903), American shoe manufacturer, newspaper owner, and politician
- Elihu Emory Jackson (1837–1907), American businessman and politician, 41st governor of Maryland, United States
- Elihu Katz (1926–2021), American-Israeli sociologist
- Elihu Lauterpacht (1928–2017), British academic and lawyer
- Elihu H. Mason (1831–1896), Union Army soldier in the American Civil War awarded the Medal of Honor for his part in the Great Locomotive Chase
- E. Spencer Miller (1817–1879), American dean of the University of Pennsylvania Law School
- Elihu Palmer (1764–1806), founder of the Deistical Society of New York
- Elihu Phillips (1800–1884), American businessman, politician, and Wisconsin pioneer
- Elihu Roberts (1897–1975), American Negro league baseball outfielder
- Elihu Root (1845–1937), American statesman and recipient of the Nobel Peace Prize
- Elihu Thomson (1853–1937), English-born American engineer and inventor instrumental in the founding of electrical companies
- Elihu Vedder (1836–1923), American painter, book illustrator, and poet
- Elihu B. Washburne (1816–1887), American politician and a founder of Republican Party
- Elihu S. Williams (1835–1903), American farmer, lawyer, soldier, and politician
- Elihu Yale (1649–1721), British-American colonial administrator and philanthropist, benefactor of Yale University

== Biblical figures ==
- Elihu (Job), a speaker who challenges Job in the Book of Job (chapters 32–37)
- an Ephraimite and grandfather to Samuel (mentioned in 1 Samuel 1:1)
- a brother of David, king of Israel (1 Samuel 16:6)
- a chief of the Tribe of Manasseh (1 Chronicles 12:21)
- a Korahite (1 Chronicles 26:7)

== Fictional characters ==
- Judge Elihu Smails, co-founder of the Bushwood Country Club, in the film Caddyshack
- Elihu Willsson, a leading character in Dashiell Hammett's novel Red Harvest
- Elihu Yale, the Atlanta Police Chief in Tom Wolfe's novel A Man in Full
- Elihu "Sam" Nivens, the protagonist in Robert A. Heinlein's The Puppet Masters
- Elihu Whipple, one of the two main characters in the H. P. Lovecraft short story "The Shunned House"
- Elihu, dancer up on Leemor's bed in the Phish song "Sample in a Jar"

== See also ==
- Eliahu (also spelled Eliyahu)
