= Donaldson Academy =

School in North Carolina

Coordinates: 35.056°N 78.890°W

Donaldson Academy (1832 - ?) in Fayetteville, North Carolina was incorporated in 1833 by an act of the North Carolina General Assembly.

Elijah Frink Rockwell taught at the school.

== History ==
The school was planned at Hay Mount, North Carolina near Fayetteville. Manual labor was dropped after its second year.

Simeon Colton served as its principal. During that period, he was tried for heresy before the Presbyterian over his teachings about marrying the sisters of wives who died. Students attended the trial.

== Alumni ==
- Charles Manly Stedman
- James Cameron MacRad, judge, law professor, and author

=== Donaldson Military Academy ===
- Clement Read Strudwick (1900–1958), artist
