= The Rise of American Democracy: Jefferson to Lincoln =

- First edition
- Author: Sean Wilentz
- Publisher: W. W. Norton & Company
- Publication date: 2005
- Media type: Print (hardcover)
- Pages: 1,004
- ISBN: 0-393-05820-4

The Rise of American Democracy: Jefferson to Lincoln is a non-fiction book by Sean Wilentz published in 2005 by W. W. Norton & Company.

== Contents ==
Preface
Prologue
I. THE CRISIS OF THE NEW WORLD ORDER

1. American Democracy in a Revolutionary Age
2. The Republican Interest and the Self-Created Democracy
3. The Making of Jeffersonian Democracy
4. Jefferson’s Two Presidencies
5. Nationalism and the War of 1812

II. DEMOCRACY ASCENDANT

6. The Era of Bad Feelings
7. Slavery, Compromise, and Democratic Politics
8. The Politics of Moral Improvement
9. The Autocracy and Democracy of America
10. The Jackson Era: Uneasy Beginnings
11. Radical Democracies
12. 1932: Jackson’s Crucial Year
13. Banks, Abolitionists, and the Equal Rights Democracy
14. "The Republic has degenerated into a Democracy"
15. The Politics of Hard Times
16. Whigs, Democrats, and Democracy

III. SLAVERY AND THE CRISIS OF AMERICAN DEMOCRACY

17. Whig Debacle, Democratic Confusion
18. Antislavery, Annexation, and the Advent of Young Hickory
19. The Bitter Fruits of Manifest Destiny
20. War, Slavery, and the American 1848
21. Political Truce, Uneasy Consequences
22. The Truce Collapses
23. A Nightmare Broods Over Society
24. The Faith That Might Makes Right
25. The Iliad of All Our Woes

Epilogue

== Reviews ==
Describing The Rise of American Democracy as "magisterial," historian Eric Foner places particular emphasis on Wilentz’s commitment to writing "political history."

The Rise of American Democracy reaffirms the vitality and relevance of political history. Once the centerpiece of the study of the American past, political history has been overshadowed of late by social and cultural analysis and efforts to write history "from below." Accused of elitism or simply deemed irrelevant as subjects like the family, consumer culture, and racial and ethnic relations rose to the fore, political historians have been reduced to pleading with their colleagues to bring politics back into discussions of the American past.

Rather than history as "merely a reflection of social forces," Wilentz acknowledges a reciprocity in which "politics shaped American society and was, in turn, shaped by it."

Foner cautions readers that The Rise of American Democracy, at over 1,000 pages, presents a challenge due simply to its length, "too long and detailed, no doubt, for the taste of some readers."

Historian Gordon S. Wood review of The Rise of American Democracy marvels at the sheer length of this "monumental" tome to antebellum politics. Though "a tour de force of historical compilation and construction," Woods anticipates that the work may overwhelm all but the most dedicated scholars and graduate students.

Wilentz has filled his book with an extraordinary multitude of details about nearly every conceivable aspect of antebellum politics, both at the state and federal levels. Of course, since context is everything in history, excessive detail of this kind warms a historian's heart…Awesome in its coverage of political events, this is a long, long read.

Praising the book as "old-fashioned", Wood notes that Wilentz approaches his topic in a manner that rejects current trends of viewing history "through the lenses of race, gender and popular culture."

Rather, Wilentz locates the struggles over democracy and slavery among white male politicians and activists, placing them at the center of his narrative. As such, the work is explicitly contrary to "the new political historians…who explicitly reject any sort of narrative of dead white males bringing about the triumph of democracy within the two-party system. This, however, is the very subject of Wilentz's book."

The Rise of American Democracy includes a number of engaging and informative "vignettes" concerning key political episodes in the early 19th century America, among these The Peggy Eaton affair, Rhode Island’s Dorr Rebellion and John Brown’s raid.

== Sources ==
- Foner, Eric. "The American Political Tradition—Review of The Rise of American Democracy: Jefferson to Lincoln by Sean Wilentz". The Nation. October 31, 2005.
- Wilentz, Sean. 2005. The Rise of American Democracy: Jefferson to Lincoln. W. W. Norton and Company, New York. ISBN 0-393-05820-4.
- Wood, Gordon S. "'The Rise of American Democracy': A Constant Struggle". The New York Times. November 13, 2005.
