= Elijah Pyle =

English footballer

Personal information
- Full name: Elijah St Quentin Pyle
- Date of birth: 22 September 1918
- Place of birth: Chester-le-Street, England
- Date of death: 31 August 2009 (aged 90)
- Place of death: Grange Villa, England
- Position: Inside forward

Senior career*
Years	Team	Apps	(Gls)
- West Stanley
1947–1948	York City	10	(3)
1948–	West Stanley		
Total		10	(3)
- * Club domestic league appearances and goals

Elijah St Quentin Pyle (22 September 1918 – 31 August 2009) was an English professional footballer who played as an inside forward in the Football League for York City, and in non-League football for West Stanley.

Born in Chester-le-Street, County Durham, Pyle started his career at West Stanley, before moving to York City in 1947, where he made 10 League appearances and scored three goals. He thereafter returned to West Stanley.

He died in Grange Villa, County Durham in 2009, aged 90.
