= Elijah Frink Rockwell =

American minister and educator

Elijah Frink Rockwell (October 6, 1809 – April 15, 1888) was an American minister and educator.

== Early and personal life ==
Rockwell was born in Lebanon, Connecticut, October 6, 1809, the second son of Joseph and Sarah (Huntington) Rockwell. He entered Yale College in 1829, but left before the end of Freshman year, and pined the next class at the beginning of their Sophomore year. After graduating in 1834, he taught in Monson, Massachusetts, which lasted until 1835 and was then induced to go to Fayetteville, N C, as assistant to the Rev. Simeon Colton, formerly of Monson, in the Donaldson Academy, of which he had recently taken charge.

He married, Margaret K. McNeill, daughter of George McNeill, of Fayetteville, June 18, 1839. She died May 21, 1866, without having children. His next marriage was with Bettie II Browne, daughter of Archibald S. Browne. Browne was associated with Davidson College and lived in Fayetteville. She survived him with one of their two sons produced during the marriage.

== Teaching and ministerial work ==
Rockwell had assisted the Reverend Simeon Colton when he had been in charge of the Donaldson Academy. He left this position in 1837 to pursue theological studies, spending one year at Princeton Theological Seminary and a second year at the Columbia Theological Seminary in Columbia, S. C. He supplied the Presbyterian Church in Fayetteville from June, 1839, to December, 1840, in which month he removed to the Presbyterian Church in Statesville, Iredell County, over which he was ordained and installed as pastor in the following spring.

He continued in this charge until October, 1850, when he accepted a call to a Professorship in Davidson College, N C, where he remained for eighteen years. He at first held the chair of Natural History, and later, of Latin. In August, 1868, he returned to Statesville, and for two years acted as the Principal of Concord Female College, which he had aided in establishing. However, the institution was subsequently sold for debt, by which means as well as by the results of the American Civil War he lost a large amount. For another year or two he conducted a classical academy for boys.

During all these years since his retirement from the pastorate he had supplied vacant churches near his residence for most of the time, and in 1872 he removed from Statesville to Cool Springs, about ten miles to the northeast, where he supplied the local church, Fifth Creek Church, and two others. About 1883 he retired from active work, but his declining years were still employed in his favorite studies and in works of practical benevolence. The degree of Doctor of Divinity was conferred upon him by the University of North Carolina in 1882.

He had been in failing health for two years, and died after a week's illness, of pneumonia, at his home in Cool Springs, April 15, 1888, at the age of 79.
