= Elijah Landsofer =

Rabbi from Bohemia (d. 1702)

Rabbi Elija or Elia Bumsla (died 1702) was born to Karmi Bumsla in the Central Bohemian Region of the Czech Republic. Karmi moved to Prague from Mladá Boleslav (Czech pronunciation: [ˈmladaː ˈbolɛslaf]; German: Jungbunzlau, Latin: Bumsla), and took on the Yiddish and Latin pronunciation Bumsla. Elija was a professional scribe and received the title "sofer medina" or Land-Sofer for being well known throughout the Bohemian region. His youngest son, Jonah, who became a well known scribe as well, adopted his father's title for his surname as well.

Elija married Gittele Brandeis granddaughter of Rabbi Samuel Brandeis HaLevi, President of Prague Gemeinde. Both Samuel and his wife were grandchildren of Judah Loew ben Bezalel, the famed Maharal of Prague. Gittele and Elija had four sons. The eldest son was Rabbi Bezalel, Rabbi Leib Bumsla (1655–1734) the second son, the third was Rabbi Gershon Brandeis, known as "Rosh Hakahal", and the youngest son was Rabbi Jonah Landsofer (1678–1712). Rabbi Jonah was the author of numerous books and responsa including the sefer "me'il tzedaka". Originally authored anonymously, it wasn't till nearly 100 years later that the Noda Biyhuda revealed the author's name. "Even that the author hid his name due to his great humility...it appears to me that he is one of the early sages...HaRov HaGaon the famous, the pious, our teacher, Jona Landsofer...".

Among his descendants are Rabbi Wolf Bumslau, Rabbi Samuel Bondi (1794–1877), founder of the orthodox congregation of Mainz, father-in-law of the author, Rabbi Marcus Lehmann, and grandfather-in-law of Rabbi Eliezer Liepman Philip Prins (1835–1915), progenitor of the Jewish Prins family. It is likely that Elija is also the ancestor of the Bomze and Bomzer families, but further research is required.
