= Elijah Ayolabi =

Ayolabi Elijah Ayolabi
- Born: Ayolabi Elijah Ayolabi
- Occupations: Geophysicist, Vice chancellor of Mountain Top University, specialist in environmental Geophysics.

Ayolabi Elijah Ayolabi is a Nigerian geophysicist.

== Biography ==
Ayolabi is Vice Chancellor of Mountain Top University. He is a specialist in environmental geophysics, as well as engineering and exploration geophysics. He has executed several environmental and exploration studies for reputable organisations such as Schlumberger and Celtel. He is a member of Nigerian Mining and Geoscience Society (NMGS), Nigerian Association of Petroleum Exploration (NAPE) and Science Association of Nigeria. Ayolabi has successively trained over 100 postgraduate students with over 90 articles in journals and referred conference proceedings locally and internationally.
