= Elihu Roberts =

American baseball player

- Outfielder
- Born: August 2, 1897; Valdosta, Georgia, U.S.
- Died: March 23, 1975 (aged 77); Atlantic City, New Jersey, U.S.
- Threw: Right

Negro league baseball debut
- 1916, for the Bacharach Giants

Last appearance
- 1920, for the Hilldale Club

Teams
- Bacharach Giants (1916–1918); Hilldale Club (1919–1920)

Elihu D. Roberts (August 2, 1897 – March 23, 1975) was an American Negro league outfielder between 1916 and 1920.

A native of Valdosta, Georgia, Roberts attended Morris Brown College. He made his Negro leagues debut in 1916 with the Bacharach Giants, and played with the club for three seasons. Roberts went on to play for the Hilldale Club for two more seasons, finishing his career in 1920. He died in Atlantic City, New Jersey in 1975 at age 77.
