= Denair Mitchell =

Bahamian footballer

Personal information
- Date of birth: 23 August 1989 (age 37)
- Place of birth: Nassau, Bahamas
- Position: Striker

Senior career*
Years	Team	Apps	(Gls)
2007–2013	Cavalier		
2014	Towson University		

International career^{‡}
2008	Bahamas	1	(0)
- * Club domestic league appearances and goals ‡ National team caps and goals as of 3 April 2016

Denair Mitchell is a Bahamian international soccer player, who plays as a striker for Cavalier FC and the Bahamas national team

== International career ==
He made his international debut for Bahamas in a June 2008 FIFA World Cup qualification match against Jamaica, his sole international match as of April 2016.
