= Clement Thornton Hallam =

Sir Clement Thornton Hallam
- Born: 4 January 1891; Somerset East, South Africa
- Died: 17 March 1965 (aged 74); Harrow on the Hill
- Education: Bedford Modern School
- Known for: Solicitor to the General Post Office

Sir Clement Thornton Hallam (4 January 1891 – 17 March 1965) was solicitor to the General Post Office.

== Life ==
Hallam was born in Somerset East, Cape Colony in 1891, the son of William Abner, from Leicester, England, and Wilhelmina Charlotte, from Cape Colony. He was educated at Bedford Modern School.

In 1914, Hallam was admitted to the bar and he entered the Solicitor's Department of the General Post Office in 1915 becoming Solicitor to the GPO (1943–53). During World War II he was seconded to the Imperial Defence College. He was made a Knight Bachelor in 1948.

In 1915, Hallam married Irene Parrington Faraday in Ormskirk, Lancashire. They had two sons. Sir Clement Hallam died in Harrow on 17 March 1965.
