= Elijah Dart =

English footballer

Personal information
- Date of birth: 12 March 1880
- Place of birth: Chesterfield, England
- Date of death: 1954 (aged 73–74)
- Height: 5 ft 11 in (1.80 m)
- Position: Wing half

Senior career*
Years	Team	Apps	(Gls)
1908–1909	Skinningrove		
1909–1910	Grimsby Town	3	(0)
- * Club domestic league appearances and goals

Elijah Dart (12 March 1880 – 1954) was an English professional footballer who played as a wing half.
