= Eliahu =

Eliahu or Eliyahu (Hebrew: אליהו) is a masculine Hebrew name of biblical origin. It means "My God is Yahweh" and derives from the prophet Elijah who, according to the Bible, lived during the reign of King Ahab (9th century BCE).

People named Eliahu or Eliyahu, include:

== Given name ==
=== Eliahu ===
- Eliahu Eilat (1903–1990), Israeli diplomat, Orientalist and President of the Hebrew University of Jerusalem
- Eliahu Gat (1919–1987), Israeli landscape painter
- Eliahu Inbal (born 1936), Israeli conductor
- Eliahu Nissim (1933-2020), Israeli former professor of aeronautical engineering and former President of the Open University of Israel
- Eliahu Stern (born 1948), Israeli professor emeritus of geography and planning

=== Eliyahu ===
- Eliyahu Bet-Zuri (1922–1945), Jewish Lehi member and assassin
- Eliyahu Berligne (1866–1959), a founder of Tel Aviv, a member of the Yishuv in Mandate Palestine and a signatory of the Israeli declaration of independence
- Eli Cohen (1924–1965), Israeli spy
- Eliyahu Golomb (1893–1945), leader of the Jewish defense effort in Mandate Palestine and chief architect of the Haganah
- Eliyahu Hakim (1925–1945), Jewish Lehi member and assassin
- Eli Ohana (born 1964), Israeli former football player and coach, and current Chairman of Israeli club Beitar Jerusalem
- Eliyahu Moshe Panigel (1850–1919), Sephardi chief rabbi of the Ottoman Empire, Palestine and Jerusalem
- Eliyahu Sasson (1902–1978), Israeli politician and cabinet minister
- Eli Suissa (born 1956), Israeli former politician and cabinet minister

== Surname ==
=== Eliahu ===
- Shlomo Eliahu (born 1936), Israeli businessman, billionaire and former politician

=== Eliyahu ===
- Amihai Eliyahu (born 1971), Israeli politician, son of Shmuel Eliyahu and grandson of Mordechai Eliyahu
- Eitan Ben Eliyahu (born 1944), retired Israel Defense Forces major general and Israeli Air Force commander
- Lior Eliyahu (born 1985), Israeli basketball player
- Mordechai Eliyahu (1929–2010), Israeli rabbi, posek and Chief Rabbi of Israel
- Shmuel Eliyahu (born 1956), Israeli Orthodox Chief Rabbi of Safed and member of the Chief Rabbinate Council, son of Mordechai Eliyahu
- Tomer Eliyahu (born 1975), Israeli retired footballer

== See also ==
- Elihu, common spelling in North America
