= Elihu W. Baldwin =

American Presbyterian minister (1789–1840)

- Born: December 25, 1789; Durham, New York
- Died: October 15, 1840 (aged 50); Crawfordsville, Indiana

Elihu Whittlesey Baldwin (born Durham, New York, December 25, 1789; died Crawfordsville, Indiana, October 15, 1840) was a prominent American Presbyterian minister and the first president of Wabash College.

== Life ==
Elihu Baldwin was the second of six children of Deacon Jonathan Baldwin (1758–1843) and his wife Submit (Lord) (1764–1855). The Baldwins had moved from Durham, Connecticut to a new settlement in Durham, New York and later continued to move west, spending the end of their lives in Atwater, Ohio. The Baldwins were joined in Durham by Jonathan's brother Seth and his family, including future missionary Dwight Baldwin (1798–1886).

Baldwin was admitted to Yale College in 1807; he took five years to complete his studies, taking time off to teach to help pay his way. After spending several years teaching at an academy in Fairfield, Baldwin was admitted to the Andover Theological Seminary in 1814 and was ordained September 10, 1817. He was initially employed by the Young Men's Society of New York City as a missionary in the area of Corlaer's Hook, then a neighborhood notorious for prostitution and drinking. By March 1818 he had founded the seventh Presbyterian church in New York City, meeting in that district, and by the time of Baldwin's death the congregation had grown to over 1900 members. The congregation built a new church in 1826, at the corner of Broome and Ridge streets; it burned down on February 17, 1831.

In 1835 Baldwin was asked to take up the presidency of a college to be erected in Crawfordsville, Indiana; he accepted and proceeded to raise funds for the new institution and move his family there. Baldwin presided over a difficult beginning; the college's first building burned down in 1838 and needed to be rebuilt. Baldwin fell ill during a trip taken for the college and died October 15, 1840.

== Publications ==
Baldwin published several short works published as religious tracts: "On Fashionable Amusements" (New England Tract Society, 1815) and "Universalism Exposed" (New England Tract Society, 1823). He also published works aimed at use in Sunday schools - a book of moralizing stories, "The Five Apprentices" (1828) and "The Young Freethinker Reclaimed" (American Sunday-School Union, 1829).

Two of Baldwin's sermons were published in the publication "The National Preacher" in the December 1827 issue. His inaugural speech was published as "An Address Delivered in Crawfordsville, Indiana, July 13th, 1836: On Occasion of His Inauguration as President of Wabash College", and also his "Address on the encouragement of emulation in the education of youth : delivered before the Education Convention of Indiana" (1837).

== Family ==
Baldwin married Julia C. Baldwin (1800–1850) (not a close relation) on May 12, 1819. They had seven children, three of whom died in childhood. Julia (1822), Joseph (1826), Frances (1829), and Mary (1841) survived to adulthood. Joseph, a lawyer, was a state senator in Missouri in 1864.
