= Elijah Bentley =

Elijah Bentley (fl. 1799–1814) was a Baptist minister and office holder from Upper Canada who pursued a variety of vocations including farming. He became important to Canadian history because of his trial for sedition during the War of 1812.

Elijah's father had brought an extended family to Upper Canada from the United States in search of homesteads and a new life. Elijah obtained at least one land grant in the Markham area. He, and other non loyalist Americans came under the scrutiny of Lieutenant Governor Francis Gore during a bi-election for Robert Thorpe in 1807. Gore considered the settlers like the Bentleys to have "brought the very worst principles of their own constitution with them."
