= Elijah Taylor =

Elijah Taylor may refer to:

- Elijah Taylor (rugby league) (born 1990), New Zealand rugby league player
- Elijah Taylor (Australian footballer) (born 2001), Australian rules footballer
