= John Hallam (disambiguation) =

John Hallam (1941-2006) was a British character actor.

John Hallam may also refer to:

- John Hallam (died 1537), English rebel against King Henry VIII
- John Hallam (died 1900), Canadian merchant and alderman
- John Hallam (priest) (1728-1811), canon of Windsor
