= Elijah Johnson =

Elijah Johnson may refer to:

- Elijah Johnson (agent) (1789–1849), American colonial agent
- Elijah Johnson (basketball) (born 1990), American basketball player
- Elijah Johnson (singer) (born 1998), American singer
- Elijah Johnson (Home and Away), a character in the soap opera Home and Away
