= Elijah Baldwin =

American politician (1830–??)

- Born: 1830
- Known for: American state legislator during the Reconstruction era in Alabama

Elijah Baldwin was an American state legislator during the Reconstruction era in Alabama. He represented Wilcox County, Alabama, in the Alabama House of Representatives. He also served as a constable in Wilcox County.

He was born in South Carolina in 1830. He worked as a shoemaker.

He was a leader at the Antioch Baptist Church in Camden, Alabama.

He and other African American legislators had a role in rebuilding the state's infrastructure and institutions, particularly with regards to education and civil rights, education, and voting rights. He and other state legislators who were African American and served during the Reconstruction era in Alabama are listed on a historical marker commemorating their service.

Despite the progress made during Reconstruction, the gains made by African Americans were short-lived. The period was marked by violence and discrimination, particularly in the form of Jim Crow laws and other forms of systemic oppression that were put in place in the decades that followed.

Nevertheless, the legacy of figures like Elijah Baldwin continues to be celebrated and remembered, as they helped to lay the foundation for the civil rights movement of the 20th century and beyond. Their contributions serve as a reminder of the ongoing struggle for racial justice and equality in the United States.

== See also ==
- African American officeholders from the end of the Civil War until before 1900
