= Jonah Landsofer =

Jonah ben Elijah Landsofer (1678 – 9 October 1712) was a Bohemian rabbi and Talmudist. He made a special study of the Masorah and was well versed in the regulations concerning the writing of scrolls of the Law, whence his name "Landsofer." He studied also secular science and Kabbalah, and as a kabbalist he, with Moses Ḥasid, was sent by Abraham Broda to Vienna to engage in a disputation with the Shabbethaians. He died in Prague in 1712.

Though he died young, Landsofer wrote several important works: "Ẓawwa'ah," ethics, printed in Asher b. Jehiel's "Orḥot Ḥayyim" (Frankfurt am Main, 1717); "Me'il Ẓedaḳah," responsa, at the end of which are notes on Euclid (written in 1710, and published by his grandson Yom-Ṭob Landsofer, Prague, 1757); "Bene Yonah," novellæ on the Masorah and the regulations concerning the writing of scrolls of the Law (ib. 1802); "Kanfe Yonah," novellæ on Shulḥan 'Aruk, Yoreh De'ah (to § 111; ib. 1812). His pupil Elijah b. Azriel quotes, in the preface to his "Miktab le-Eliyahu," a work of Landsofer entitled "Me'ore Or," on corrections for scrolls of the Law.
