= Elijah Williams =

Elijah Williams may refer to:

- Elijah Williams (chess player) (1809–1854), British chess player
- Elijah Williams (defensive back) (born 1975), former American football player
- Elijah Williams (defensive lineman) (born 2002), American football player
