= Grange Villa =

Village in County Durham, England

Coordinates: 54.862°N 1.636°W

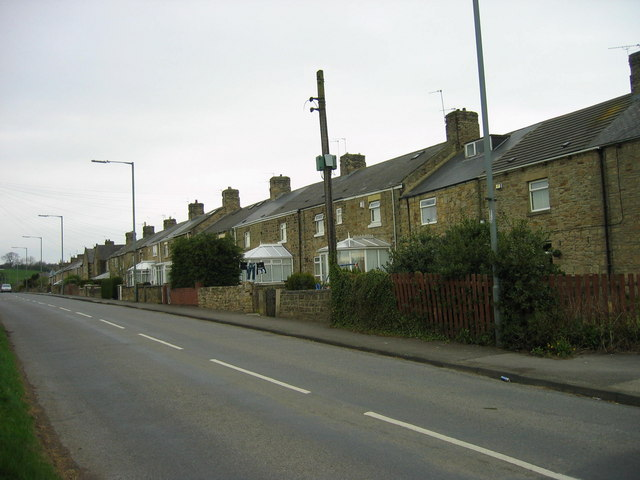

- Location within County Durham
- Population: 877
- OS grid reference: NZ233520
- Unitary authority: County Durham
- Ceremonial county: County Durham
- Region: North East
- Country: England
- Sovereign state: United Kingdom
- Police: Durham
- Fire: County Durham and Darlington
- Ambulance: North East

Grange Villa is a village situated in County Durham, England. It is located between the towns of Stanley and Chester-le-Street.

== History ==
Grange Villa was built to house miners; Stone Row first, then the top block of Queen Street, followed by the rest of the streets. The Handen Hold Colliery was to the north of the village past the Binney burn toward West Pelton. It closed in 1968; the Alma Pit, to the south of the village toward Twizell Burn, closed in the 1950s. A railway line ran from the Alma Pit, behind Front Street towards the Pelton Fell landings. Miners were still using carbide lamps to work by down the mine in the late 1950s.

There was a cinema, snooker hall, fish shop, a clothing factory, several newsagents, bakers, and fruit shops, as well as the Nobles Organisation that started in Grange Villa with Joe Nobles Bingo. Between Pine Street and Stone Row there were gardens where pigs and pigeons were kept. The First old age pensioners' club house was built by the old men of the village at the bottom of East Street in the late 1950s. Grange Villa Pavilion Cinema showed the first talking movie in the area and Bud Flanagan appeared live when it opened. The land between Stone Row and Pine Street used to be the rear gardens of those properties and were purchased by the local council during the early 1980s on compulsory purchase orders.

== The village today ==
The village has one local newsagents, one tanning and beauty shop, a barbers and a community center. Grange Villa has a golf course on the north edge of the village, which is open to the public, and paths running through the forests surrounding the village. There was a church and a chapel, however in the last few years the church has both been sold off as a builders storage depot, and the chapel made into a house.

Since 2004, regeneration of the village has been underway. The community, with help from grants and fundraising, opened the new Grange Villa Enterprise Centre in December 2004 which is used by residents young and old from provide cheap lunchtime meals to slimming clubs and Sure Start baby groups. Speed bumps have been introduced, and there are plans for more housing to be built at the top of East Street as well between Stone Row and Pine Street. There has been much debate about The Square being turned over to housing as this is one of the few safe play areas in the village for local children. The village has a 16+ football team.
