= Roger Hallam =

Roger Hallam may refer to:

- Roger Hallam (Australian politician) (born 1943), Australian politician
- Roger Hallam (activist) (born 1966), British environmental activist
