= Elijah Smith =

Elijah Smith may refer to:

- Elijah F. Smith (1792–1879), mayor of Rochester, New York
- Elijah Smith (footballer) (1860–?), English footballer
