= Graeme Hallam =

English cricketer

Personal information
- Full name: Graeme Hallam
- Born: 6 November 1973 (age 53); Wallsend, Northumberland, England
- Batting: Right-handed
- Bowling: Right-arm medium

Domestic team information
- Years: Team
- 1994–2003: Northumberland

Career statistics
Competition	List A
Matches	6
Runs scored	68
Batting average	17.00
100s/50s	–/–
Top score	36
Balls bowled	–
Wickets	–
Bowling average	–
5 wickets in innings	–
10 wickets in match	–
Best bowling	–
Catches/stumpings	1/–
- Source: Cricinfo, 30 June 2011

Graeme Hallam (born 6 January 1973) is a former English cricketer. Hallam was a right-handed batsman who bowled right-arm medium pace. He was born in Wallsend, Northumberland. Hallam made his debut for Northumberland in the 1994 Minor Counties Championship against Lincolnshire.

Hallam made his debut for Northumberland in the 1994 Minor Counties Championship against Lincolnshire. He played Minor counties cricket for Northumberland from 1994 to 2003, which included 44 Minor Counties Championship matches and 15 MCCA Knockout Trophy matches. He made his List A debut against Ireland in the 1999 NatWest Trophy. He made 5 further List A appearances for the county, the last coming against Shropshire in the 1st round of the 2004 Cheltenham & Gloucester Trophy, which was played in 2003. In his 6 List A matches, he scored 68 runs at an average of 17.00, with a high score of 36.
