= Elijah Anderson =

Elijah Anderson may refer to:

- Elijah Anderson (rugby league) (born 1999), Australian rugby league footballer
- Elijah Anderson (sociologist) (born 1943), American sociologist
- Elijah Anderson (Underground Railroad) (1808–1861)
