= Elijah K. Sumbeiywo =

Kenyan politician

Elijah Sumbeiywo

Member of Parliament for Keiyo North
- In office 1997–2002
- Constituency: Keiyo North

Assistant Minister for Agriculture & Rural Development

Personal details
- Cause of death: Pancreatic cancer
- Occupation: Politician
- Known for: Member of Parliament and Assistant Minister roles

Elijah Sumbeiywo was a Kenyan politician who served as a Member of Parliament for Keiyo North from 1997 to 2002.

Before joining politics he served under Moi regime as the Presidential Escort Commander.

He also served an Assistant Minister in the Office of the President and Ministry of Planning & National Development and later became Assistant Minister for Agriculture & Rural Development.

Sumbeiywo was enrolled to the Kalenjin Council of Elders in 2009.

He died in 2012 following a battle with pancreatic cancer.
