= Elijah Wolfson =

American writer and editor

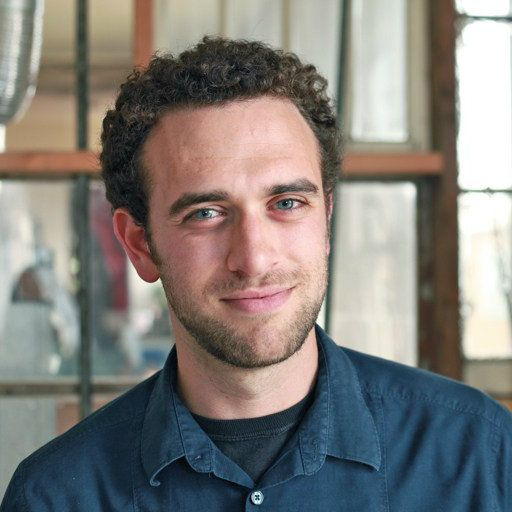
Elijah Wolfson

Elijah Wolfson is an American writer and editor. He is currently a literary agent at Massie McQuilkin & Altman. Previously, he was an editor at The Los Angeles Times, where he managed the environment, health and science team. Before that, he was an editorial director at Time, an editor at Quartz, and a senior editor at Newsweek. He has primarily covered science, health, technology and culture. Wolfson has contributed to The Atlantic, Al Jazeera America, Vice, and the Huffington Post, and has appeared on MSNBC, BBC World News, NPR and other media outlets.

Wolfson was born in Cambridge, Massachusetts, and raised in Ridgewood, New Jersey, and Manhattan, New York. He studied rhetoric and creative writing at the University of California, Berkeley. He is the son of Dr. Elizabeth Wolfson a psychotherapist, and of the scholar Elliot Wolfson. In 2013, he married the writer and painter Jas Johl, his former co-editor at The Cal Literature and Arts Magazine at Berkeley. The pair separated in 2018.

In 2013, Wolfson was awarded a Langeloth Health Journalism Fellowship by the John Jay College Center on Media, Crime, and Justice. In 2015, he was awarded an International Reporting Project Fellowship, and covered the Nepal Earthquake of 2015 from the ground. In 2015, Wolfson was also awarded the Metcalf Institute Fellowship and the 2015 Population Institute Global Media Award for his reporting on the relationship between climate change and access to family planning in developing countries.

In 2016, his Newsweek cover story investigated allegations of child abuse at Jewish Chabad school system of New York. The story sparked protests.
