= Elijah Shaw =

- Occupation(s): Bodyguard, Security Agency Owner, Author
- Organization: ISC Safety Net
- Known for: Providing security for celebrities like Usher Raymond, Naomi Campbell, Chaka Khan, and Chris Rock
- Television: Appeared as himself in Usher Raymond's "Confessions" music video
- Board member of: Board member of Women's Advocates domestic violence shelter

Elijah Shaw is an American bodyguard and owner of a security agency. Shaw's clientele has included Usher Raymond, Naomi Campbell, Chaka Khan, and Chris Rock.

Shaw has often been seen in the company of his long-time client Usher Raymond, for instance when appearing as himself in the singer's Confessions music video or in Usher's documentary and public appearances.

In 2003 Shaw was contracted to handle the security services of rap star 50 Cent who had recently re-launched his career after being shot 9 times by unknown assailants.

In 2006 Shaw launched a program called the ISC Safety Net that is described on the company's website as is an “initiative designed to help victims of domestic violence by providing pro bono security services to victims and shelters”. The following year Shaw became a board member of the Women's Advocates domestic violence shelter.

In 2018, Shaw and Dale L. June published the coauthored book An Introduction to Celebrity Protection and Touring; Shaw is also credited on June's Introduction to Executive Protection.
