= Elijah Embree Hoss =

American bishop

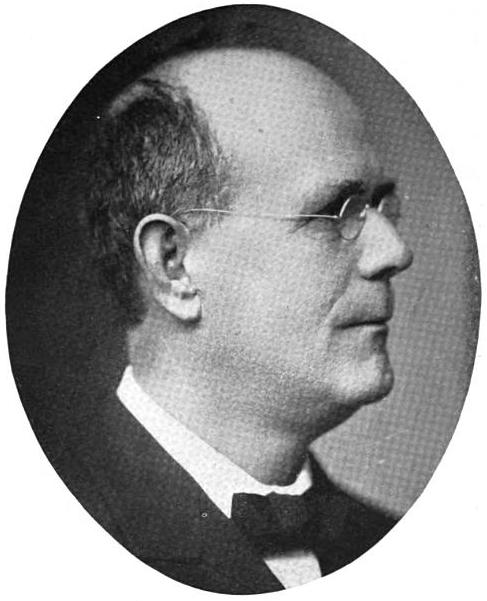
Elijah Embree Hoss

Elijah Embree Hoss, Sr (April 14, 1849 – April 23, 1919) was an American bishop of the Methodist Episcopal Church, South, elected in 1902. He also distinguished himself as a Methodist pastor, college professor, administrator, and editor.

== Early life ==
Born on April 14, 1849, along Cherokee Creek, four miles from Jonesboro in Washington County, Tennessee, U.S.A., he was a son of Henry and Anna Maria (née Sevier) Hoss. His mother was a granddaughter of General John Sevier. The family moved to Jonesboro before Elijah was two years old. He was the second child and the first son of a family of eight children. He professed faith in Jesus Christ and joined the M.E. Church, South, at Jonesboro when he was ten years old.

Elijah married Miss Abigail Belle "Abbie" Clark of Knoxville, Tennessee, on 19 November 1872 in Knox County, Tennessee, daughter of Edwin Reuben and Mary Ann (Sessler) Clark. Elijah and Abbie had three children: Mary Sevier "Minnie" (Headman), E.E. Jr., and Dr. Henry Sessler, M.D. Mrs. Hoss died on 15 June 1918 in Muskogee, Oklahoma.

== Education ==
Hoss was educated in the schools of Jonesboro, Tennessee. He entered Ohio Wesleyan University in 1866, studying there for two years. He then entered Emory & Henry College, earning his B.A. degree in 1869. He had acquired the habit of reading widely in early life. He was known in college for the range of his studies and the accuracy of his scholarship. His memory was prodigious, so that accurate and wide information was at his ready command.

== Honorary degrees ==
The Rev. Hoss was honored in 1885 by his alma mater, Emory and Henry College, with the degree of Doctor of Divinity. Emory and Henry similarly honored him in 1890 with the LL.D. degree, and Ohio Wesleyan University did the same in 1906.

== Ordained ministry ==
Elijah was licensed to preach in the M.E. Church, South, at Jonesboro on 8 February 1866. He was admitted on trial to the Holston Annual Conference on 29 September 1869, and was ordained in 1870. His first appointment was in Jonesboro (Jonesborough United Methodist Church). The first person he received into church membership was his own father. He was then appointed to Knoxville, Tennessee, in 1870.

In July 1872 he transferred to California to attend the Pacific Annual Conference of the Methodist Episcopal Church, South (M.E.C., S.). He was appointed to San Francisco. He then transferred to the Western North Carolina Annual Conference in 1875 and was appointed to Asheville.

== Academic and editorial ministries ==
The Rev. Hoss became a professor at Martha Washington College (which later merged with Emory and Henry College) in 1876. He was elected president of this institution in 1879. He became a professor and vice president of Emory and Henry College in 1881 and was elected president in 1885. In August 1885 the Rev. Hoss was elected to the Chair of Ecclesiastical History, Church Polity and Pastoral Theology at Vanderbilt University, serving there until 1890.

In May 1890 Rev. Hoss was elected the editor of the Nashville Christian Advocate, the primary weekly newspaper of the M.E. Church, South. He held this position until his election to the episcopacy in 1902. Previous to this, he was a delegate to five general conferences of his denomination. The final time he was elected, he lacked only six votes in the Holston Conference, besides his own, to being unanimously elected.

== Episcopal ministry ==
The Rev. Dr. Elijah Embree Hoss was elected to the episcopacy of the Methodist Episcopal Church, South, by the 1902 General Conference. His Episcopal Residence was at 810 Broadway, Nashville, Tennessee.

Bishop Hoss was a fraternal representative of his denomination to nearly every Methodist Church in the world. His last great mission of this kind was to Australia in 1915. He was the presiding bishop of the M.E. South work in Brazil from 1905 to 1908 and in the Orient in 1910 and 1915.

== Retirement, death, and burial ==
Bishop Hoss was given a year's vacation in 1914–15. He retired on account of feeble health in 1918. He died on 23 April 1919 in Muskogee, Oklahoma, at the home of his son, Henry. He was buried in Muskogee beside his wife. They were re-interred together in Maple Lawn Cemetery at Jonesboro, Tennessee, on 12 April 1924.

== Selected writings ==
- Address: "The Religious Press", Washington, Second Ecumenical Conference, 1891
- Address: "General Missionary Conference", 1901, Organization for Mission Work
- Address: "The New Demands upon Methodist Authorship", London, Third Ecumenical Conference, 1901
- Sermon: "Face to Face with the Eternal World", Wesleyan Christian Advocate, 1904
- Address: "Temperance and Prohibition", Toronto, Fourth Ecumenical Conference, 1911
- Methodist Fraternity and Federation, 1913
- David Morton - A Biography, 1916
- William McKendree, A Biographical Study
- Hymn: "O God, Great Father, Lord and King", 1903 (Published in Nashville Christian Advocate, 1904)

== Biography ==
- Life, Ecumenical Methodist, I.P. Martin.

== See also ==
- List of bishops of the United Methodist Church
