= Elijah Clarke (fighter) =

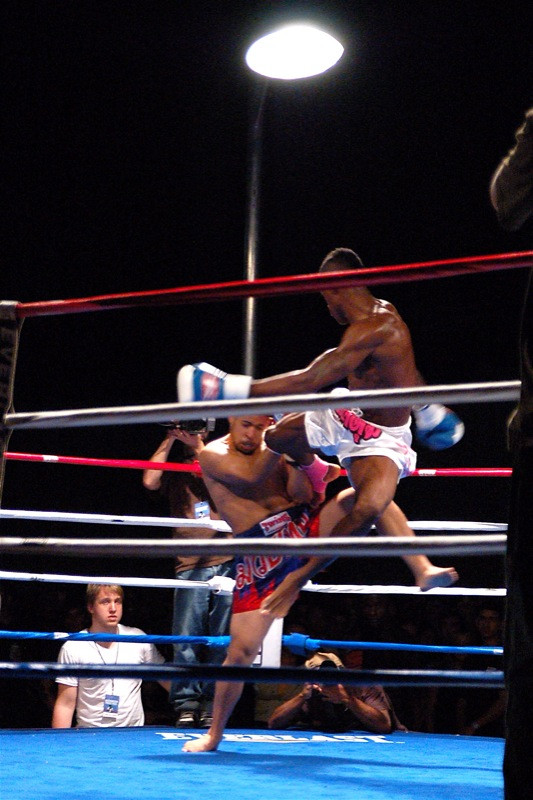
Elijah Clarke (right)

Elijah Clarke is a professional Muay Thai Kickboxer living in the United States.

== Professional Muay Thai Record ==
4 Wins, 1 Loss
Result	Opponent	Type	Date	Location	Notes
Loss	Brett Hlavacek	Unanimous Decision	2015-8-22	New York, NY	WBC Super Middleweight Title
Win	Alex Berrios	TKO	2015-2-27	New York, NY	
Win	Georgui Smaguin	Unanimous Decision	2014-9-19	New York, NY	Friday Night Fights
Win	Michael Stevens	Split Decision	2013-8-16	New York, NY	
Win	Gil Pinheiro	KO	2013-4-12	New York, NY	First "full rules" Muay Thai fight in New York
