= Simeon Colton =

American educator

Simeon Colton (January 8, 1785 – December 27, 1868) was an American minister and teacher. He served as President of Mississippi College.

He was a son of Jabez Colton and his wife Mary, daughter of Capt. Ebenezer Baldwin of Bozrah, Connecticut, and sister of Hon. Simeon Baldwin of New Haven. He was born at Somers, Connecticut, January 8, 1785. When he was about three years old, his father settled at Longmeadow, Massachusetts, and from that place he entered Yale College. He was absent teaching school during two winters of the college course, and immediately after graduating in 1806 took charge of the Monson Academy just founded at Monson, Massachusetts. He remained but one year, and thence went to Leicester Academy, of which he had charge for one year and a half. After two other brief engagements as a teacher, he removed to Salem, Massachusetts, where he studied theology under direction of Rev. Samuel Worcester, D.D.

He was licensed to preach at North Danvers by the Salem Association, May 8, 1810, and was ordained pastor of the Congregational Church at Palmer, Massachusetts, June 19, 1811. In a little more than ten years he was dismissed at his own request, and for the next nine years was again principal of Monson Academy, which he succeeded in placing on a satisfactory basis. From Monson he went to Amherst, Massachusetts, where he had charge of an academy for three years. After this he went by invitation to Fayetteville, North Carolina, January 1834, to be at the head of Donaldson Academy, an institution just founded under the care of the Presbytery. He held this situation until the close of 1839, when difficulties, produced mainly by the feelings aroused by the division of the General Assembly, caused him to resign. He taught a private school in Fayetteville, until in 1846 he was called to Clinton, Miss., as President of the newly incorporated Mississippi College. This enterprise, under the patronage of the New School Presbyterian Church, required larger funds than its friends could command, and after endeavoring in vain to build up the institution, Dr. Colton resigned in July 1848. He then returned to North Carolina, and became principal of a new academy, called Cumberland Academy, founded by Fayetteville Presbytery, and located at Summerville, Harnett County. This situation was not favorable, and after five years of trial, he resigned in November 1853. In January 1854, he removed to Asheboro, where after one year he closed his regular teaching, by reason of the infirmities of age, though he continued until near the close of life to hear some recitations in the female academy in which his wife was engaged. The degree of Doctor of Divinity was conferred upon him by Delaware College in 1846. As a teacher Dr. Colton was eminently useful. He also performed much labor as a minister in the various places of his residence.

He was married first to Lucretia, daughter of Capt. Gideon Colton of Longmeadow, Mass., September 2, 1812. She died at Palmer, July 14, 1821, leaving one daughter. He married the second time, August 9, 1823, Susan, daughter of Isham Chapman, of Tolland, Connecticut, by whom he had three sons and three daughters; of these the second son graduated at the University of North Carolina, and became a minister in that state. Mrs. Colton died at Summerville, N. C., November 24, 1850. He married the third time, December 21, 1851, Mrs. Catherine E. Fuller, widow of Jones Fuller, of Fayetteville, North Carolina, who survived him.

He died at Ashboro', December 27, 1868, aged 84.

His papers are held at the University of North Carolina's Chapel Hill Library.

== Publications ==
- “Death a gain to the Christian, a sermon delivered at Monson, December 31, 1823, at the interment of Mrs. Lucinda Ely, the wife of Rev. Alfred Ely” (1861)
- “A Man of Restless Enterprise: The Diary of Simeon Colton, 1851-1862”
