= Elijah Hallam =

Elijah Hallam (1848 – 3 March 1922) was a British miner from Derbyshire in the north of England.

He is notable as being, along with Frederick Vickers, the first recipient of the Life Saving Medal of the Most Venerable Order of St John. On 6 September 1875, at "imminent risk" to his own life, he saved 6 fellow workmen in great peril who were suspended in a broken cage in the shaft of Albert Colliery near Chesterfield. Sir Edmund Lechmere, Bt presented him with the medal at a public meeting at Whittington Moor on 18 November 1875.
