= Paul E. Johnson =

American historian (born 1942)

- Born: August 15, 1942 (age 84); Los Angeles, California, US
- Awards: Guggenheim Fellowship (1995–1996)

Academic background
- Education: University of California, Berkeley (BA); University of California, Los Angeles (MA, PhD)

Academic work
- Discipline: Historian
- Sub-discipline: United States history
- Institutions: Yale University; University of Utah; University of South Carolina

Paul E. Johnson (born August 15, 1942) is an American historian and professor emeritus at University of South Carolina.

== Life ==
Johnson earned his B.A. from the University of California, Berkeley, and graduated from the University of California, Los Angeles with a Ph.D. in 1975. He taught at Princeton University, Yale University, University of Utah, and University of South Carolina.

== Awards ==
- 1989–1990 Faculty Fellowship, Tanner Humanities Center at the University of Utah
- 1995–1996 Guggenheim Fellowship

== Works ==
- Paul E. Johnson (2003). Sam Patch, the Famous Jumper. Hill and Wang. ISBN 0-8090-8389-2.
- Paul E. Johnson; Sean Wilentz (1995). The Kingdom of Matthias: A Story of Sex and Salvation in 19th-Century America. Oxford University Press. ISBN 978-0-19-509835-8.
- Paul E. Johnson; John M. Murrin; James M. McPherson; Gary Gerstle; Emily Rosenberg; Norman Rosenberg; Pekka Hämäläinen; Denver Brunsman; Alice Fahs (1995). Liberty, Equality, Power: A History of the American People. Harcourt Brace. ISBN 978-0-15-503704-5. (7th edition Cengage Learning, 2019, ISBN 978-1337699747)
- Paul E. Johnson, ed. (1994). African-American Christianity: Essays in History. University of California Press. ISBN 978-0-520-07594-8.
- A Shopkeeper's Millennium: Society and Revivals in Rochester, New York, 1815-1837 (Hill & Wang, 1978). (reissued Hill and Wang, 2004, ISBN 978-0-8090-1635-8)
